

543001–543100 

|-bgcolor=#E9E9E9
| 543001 ||  || — || March 29, 2008 || Catalina || CSS ||  || align=right | 1.3 km || 
|-id=002 bgcolor=#d6d6d6
| 543002 ||  || — || September 13, 2007 || Mount Lemmon || Mount Lemmon Survey ||  || align=right | 3.0 km || 
|-id=003 bgcolor=#E9E9E9
| 543003 ||  || — || August 9, 2013 || Haleakala || Pan-STARRS ||  || align=right | 1.8 km || 
|-id=004 bgcolor=#E9E9E9
| 543004 ||  || — || January 21, 2002 || Kitt Peak || Spacewatch ||  || align=right | 2.0 km || 
|-id=005 bgcolor=#d6d6d6
| 543005 ||  || — || August 7, 2013 || ESA OGS || ESA OGS ||  || align=right | 2.0 km || 
|-id=006 bgcolor=#d6d6d6
| 543006 ||  || — || July 14, 2013 || Haleakala || Pan-STARRS ||  || align=right | 2.5 km || 
|-id=007 bgcolor=#E9E9E9
| 543007 ||  || — || April 15, 2008 || Mount Lemmon || Mount Lemmon Survey ||  || align=right | 2.0 km || 
|-id=008 bgcolor=#d6d6d6
| 543008 ||  || — || August 26, 2013 || Haleakala || Pan-STARRS ||  || align=right | 3.2 km || 
|-id=009 bgcolor=#d6d6d6
| 543009 ||  || — || August 15, 2013 || Haleakala || Pan-STARRS ||  || align=right | 2.3 km || 
|-id=010 bgcolor=#fefefe
| 543010 ||  || — || February 21, 2007 || Kitt Peak || Spacewatch || H || align=right data-sort-value="0.56" | 560 m || 
|-id=011 bgcolor=#fefefe
| 543011 ||  || — || January 30, 2012 || Catalina || CSS || H || align=right data-sort-value="0.76" | 760 m || 
|-id=012 bgcolor=#d6d6d6
| 543012 ||  || — || September 1, 2013 || Mount Lemmon || Mount Lemmon Survey ||  || align=right | 2.4 km || 
|-id=013 bgcolor=#FA8072
| 543013 ||  || — || September 1, 2013 || Mount Lemmon || Mount Lemmon Survey ||  || align=right data-sort-value="0.52" | 520 m || 
|-id=014 bgcolor=#d6d6d6
| 543014 ||  || — || September 24, 2008 || Kitt Peak || Spacewatch ||  || align=right | 2.3 km || 
|-id=015 bgcolor=#d6d6d6
| 543015 ||  || — || July 30, 2013 || Kitt Peak || Spacewatch ||  || align=right | 1.9 km || 
|-id=016 bgcolor=#d6d6d6
| 543016 ||  || — || July 30, 2013 || Kitt Peak || Spacewatch ||  || align=right | 2.6 km || 
|-id=017 bgcolor=#d6d6d6
| 543017 ||  || — || June 18, 2013 || Catalina || CSS ||  || align=right | 3.9 km || 
|-id=018 bgcolor=#E9E9E9
| 543018 ROTAT ||  ||  || September 1, 2013 || SATINO Remote || J. Jahn || AGN || align=right | 1.1 km || 
|-id=019 bgcolor=#d6d6d6
| 543019 ||  || — || May 15, 2012 || Haleakala || Pan-STARRS ||  || align=right | 3.1 km || 
|-id=020 bgcolor=#d6d6d6
| 543020 ||  || — || September 1, 2013 || Mount Lemmon || Mount Lemmon Survey ||  || align=right | 2.8 km || 
|-id=021 bgcolor=#d6d6d6
| 543021 ||  || — || September 19, 2003 || Kitt Peak || Spacewatch ||  || align=right | 2.9 km || 
|-id=022 bgcolor=#d6d6d6
| 543022 ||  || — || August 12, 2013 || Haleakala || Pan-STARRS ||  || align=right | 1.8 km || 
|-id=023 bgcolor=#d6d6d6
| 543023 ||  || — || March 4, 2005 || Kitt Peak || Spacewatch ||  || align=right | 3.1 km || 
|-id=024 bgcolor=#d6d6d6
| 543024 ||  || — || September 5, 2013 || Elena Remote || A. Oreshko ||  || align=right | 3.1 km || 
|-id=025 bgcolor=#d6d6d6
| 543025 ||  || — || May 30, 1997 || Kitt Peak || Spacewatch ||  || align=right | 2.7 km || 
|-id=026 bgcolor=#d6d6d6
| 543026 ||  || — || September 22, 2008 || Kitt Peak || Spacewatch ||  || align=right | 2.8 km || 
|-id=027 bgcolor=#d6d6d6
| 543027 ||  || — || September 2, 2013 || Catalina || CSS ||  || align=right | 3.2 km || 
|-id=028 bgcolor=#d6d6d6
| 543028 ||  || — || March 31, 2011 || Haleakala || Pan-STARRS ||  || align=right | 3.3 km || 
|-id=029 bgcolor=#d6d6d6
| 543029 ||  || — || October 16, 2002 || Palomar || NEAT ||  || align=right | 2.9 km || 
|-id=030 bgcolor=#d6d6d6
| 543030 ||  || — || March 17, 2005 || Mount Lemmon || Mount Lemmon Survey || TIR || align=right | 3.3 km || 
|-id=031 bgcolor=#d6d6d6
| 543031 ||  || — || March 9, 2005 || Mount Lemmon || Mount Lemmon Survey ||  || align=right | 2.7 km || 
|-id=032 bgcolor=#d6d6d6
| 543032 ||  || — || September 6, 2013 || Elena Remote || A. Oreshko ||  || align=right | 2.9 km || 
|-id=033 bgcolor=#d6d6d6
| 543033 ||  || — || September 8, 2013 || Elena Remote || A. Oreshko ||  || align=right | 2.6 km || 
|-id=034 bgcolor=#fefefe
| 543034 ||  || — || August 27, 2005 || Anderson Mesa || LONEOS || H || align=right data-sort-value="0.82" | 820 m || 
|-id=035 bgcolor=#fefefe
| 543035 ||  || — || October 9, 2008 || Mount Lemmon || Mount Lemmon Survey || H || align=right data-sort-value="0.55" | 550 m || 
|-id=036 bgcolor=#d6d6d6
| 543036 ||  || — || September 15, 2002 || Palomar || NEAT ||  || align=right | 3.7 km || 
|-id=037 bgcolor=#d6d6d6
| 543037 ||  || — || February 13, 2010 || Mount Lemmon || Mount Lemmon Survey ||  || align=right | 2.2 km || 
|-id=038 bgcolor=#d6d6d6
| 543038 ||  || — || September 10, 2013 || Haleakala || Pan-STARRS ||  || align=right | 2.1 km || 
|-id=039 bgcolor=#E9E9E9
| 543039 ||  || — || March 12, 2007 || Kitt Peak || Spacewatch ||  || align=right | 2.8 km || 
|-id=040 bgcolor=#d6d6d6
| 543040 ||  || — || August 17, 2002 || Palomar || NEAT || EOS || align=right | 1.5 km || 
|-id=041 bgcolor=#d6d6d6
| 543041 ||  || — || September 10, 2013 || Haleakala || Pan-STARRS ||  || align=right | 2.6 km || 
|-id=042 bgcolor=#d6d6d6
| 543042 ||  || — || October 10, 2008 || Mount Lemmon || Mount Lemmon Survey ||  || align=right | 3.0 km || 
|-id=043 bgcolor=#d6d6d6
| 543043 ||  || — || February 14, 2004 || Kitt Peak || Spacewatch ||  || align=right | 3.0 km || 
|-id=044 bgcolor=#d6d6d6
| 543044 ||  || — || September 14, 2002 || Palomar || NEAT ||  || align=right | 3.2 km || 
|-id=045 bgcolor=#E9E9E9
| 543045 ||  || — || January 29, 2011 || Kitt Peak || Spacewatch ||  || align=right | 2.2 km || 
|-id=046 bgcolor=#d6d6d6
| 543046 ||  || — || September 10, 2013 || Haleakala || Pan-STARRS ||  || align=right | 2.4 km || 
|-id=047 bgcolor=#d6d6d6
| 543047 ||  || — || January 11, 2010 || Mount Lemmon || Mount Lemmon Survey ||  || align=right | 2.9 km || 
|-id=048 bgcolor=#d6d6d6
| 543048 ||  || — || September 27, 2008 || Mount Lemmon || Mount Lemmon Survey ||  || align=right | 2.3 km || 
|-id=049 bgcolor=#d6d6d6
| 543049 ||  || — || August 14, 2013 || Haleakala || Pan-STARRS ||  || align=right | 2.3 km || 
|-id=050 bgcolor=#d6d6d6
| 543050 ||  || — || May 6, 2006 || Mount Lemmon || Mount Lemmon Survey ||  || align=right | 4.4 km || 
|-id=051 bgcolor=#d6d6d6
| 543051 ||  || — || June 6, 2011 || Haleakala || Pan-STARRS ||  || align=right | 3.4 km || 
|-id=052 bgcolor=#d6d6d6
| 543052 ||  || — || September 10, 2007 || Catalina || CSS ||  || align=right | 2.9 km || 
|-id=053 bgcolor=#d6d6d6
| 543053 ||  || — || February 1, 2005 || Kitt Peak || Spacewatch ||  || align=right | 3.2 km || 
|-id=054 bgcolor=#d6d6d6
| 543054 ||  || — || April 12, 2005 || Kitt Peak || Spacewatch ||  || align=right | 2.7 km || 
|-id=055 bgcolor=#d6d6d6
| 543055 ||  || — || October 4, 2002 || Palomar || NEAT ||  || align=right | 3.9 km || 
|-id=056 bgcolor=#d6d6d6
| 543056 ||  || — || September 14, 2013 || Charleston || R. Holmes ||  || align=right | 2.7 km || 
|-id=057 bgcolor=#d6d6d6
| 543057 ||  || — || September 14, 2013 || Kitt Peak || Spacewatch ||  || align=right | 2.4 km || 
|-id=058 bgcolor=#d6d6d6
| 543058 ||  || — || September 6, 2013 || Kitt Peak || Spacewatch ||  || align=right | 2.3 km || 
|-id=059 bgcolor=#d6d6d6
| 543059 ||  || — || August 23, 2007 || Kitt Peak || Spacewatch ||  || align=right | 3.0 km || 
|-id=060 bgcolor=#d6d6d6
| 543060 Liefke ||  ||  || September 5, 2013 || SATINO Remote || J. Jahn ||  || align=right | 2.1 km || 
|-id=061 bgcolor=#d6d6d6
| 543061 ||  || — || September 5, 2007 || Catalina || CSS ||  || align=right | 3.1 km || 
|-id=062 bgcolor=#d6d6d6
| 543062 ||  || — || February 9, 2005 || Mount Lemmon || Mount Lemmon Survey ||  || align=right | 2.3 km || 
|-id=063 bgcolor=#d6d6d6
| 543063 ||  || — || September 1, 2013 || Mount Lemmon || Mount Lemmon Survey ||  || align=right | 2.6 km || 
|-id=064 bgcolor=#d6d6d6
| 543064 ||  || — || November 17, 2008 || Kitt Peak || Spacewatch ||  || align=right | 2.1 km || 
|-id=065 bgcolor=#d6d6d6
| 543065 ||  || — || December 1, 2008 || Mount Lemmon || Mount Lemmon Survey ||  || align=right | 2.3 km || 
|-id=066 bgcolor=#d6d6d6
| 543066 ||  || — || September 6, 2008 || Mount Lemmon || Mount Lemmon Survey ||  || align=right | 1.8 km || 
|-id=067 bgcolor=#E9E9E9
| 543067 ||  || — || February 10, 2003 || Bergisch Gladbach || W. Bickel ||  || align=right | 1.5 km || 
|-id=068 bgcolor=#d6d6d6
| 543068 ||  || — || September 11, 2007 || Kitt Peak || Spacewatch ||  || align=right | 2.1 km || 
|-id=069 bgcolor=#d6d6d6
| 543069 ||  || — || September 14, 2013 || Mount Lemmon || Mount Lemmon Survey ||  || align=right | 3.1 km || 
|-id=070 bgcolor=#d6d6d6
| 543070 ||  || — || September 14, 2013 || Mount Lemmon || Mount Lemmon Survey ||  || align=right | 2.1 km || 
|-id=071 bgcolor=#d6d6d6
| 543071 ||  || — || September 15, 2013 || Mount Lemmon || Mount Lemmon Survey ||  || align=right | 2.0 km || 
|-id=072 bgcolor=#d6d6d6
| 543072 ||  || — || September 13, 2013 || Mount Lemmon || Mount Lemmon Survey ||  || align=right | 2.9 km || 
|-id=073 bgcolor=#d6d6d6
| 543073 ||  || — || September 4, 2007 || Mount Lemmon || Mount Lemmon Survey ||  || align=right | 2.3 km || 
|-id=074 bgcolor=#d6d6d6
| 543074 ||  || — || September 12, 2013 || Mount Lemmon || Mount Lemmon Survey ||  || align=right | 2.4 km || 
|-id=075 bgcolor=#d6d6d6
| 543075 ||  || — || August 15, 2013 || Haleakala || Pan-STARRS ||  || align=right | 2.6 km || 
|-id=076 bgcolor=#d6d6d6
| 543076 ||  || — || August 29, 2013 || Haleakala || Pan-STARRS ||  || align=right | 2.6 km || 
|-id=077 bgcolor=#fefefe
| 543077 ||  || — || November 24, 2008 || Mount Lemmon || Mount Lemmon Survey || H || align=right data-sort-value="0.93" | 930 m || 
|-id=078 bgcolor=#d6d6d6
| 543078 ||  || — || September 7, 2013 || Charleston || R. Holmes ||  || align=right | 2.6 km || 
|-id=079 bgcolor=#d6d6d6
| 543079 ||  || — || September 27, 2002 || Palomar || NEAT ||  || align=right | 3.8 km || 
|-id=080 bgcolor=#d6d6d6
| 543080 ||  || — || September 27, 2013 || Bergisch Gladbach || W. Bickel ||  || align=right | 2.9 km || 
|-id=081 bgcolor=#E9E9E9
| 543081 ||  || — || August 15, 2013 || Oukaimeden || M. Ory ||  || align=right | 2.8 km || 
|-id=082 bgcolor=#d6d6d6
| 543082 ||  || — || September 14, 2013 || Catalina || CSS ||  || align=right | 3.3 km || 
|-id=083 bgcolor=#d6d6d6
| 543083 ||  || — || November 9, 2008 || Kitt Peak || Spacewatch ||  || align=right | 2.8 km || 
|-id=084 bgcolor=#d6d6d6
| 543084 ||  || — || September 6, 2007 || Dauban || C. Rinner, F. Kugel ||  || align=right | 2.9 km || 
|-id=085 bgcolor=#d6d6d6
| 543085 ||  || — || September 29, 2013 || Palomar || PTF ||  || align=right | 2.8 km || 
|-id=086 bgcolor=#d6d6d6
| 543086 ||  || — || September 30, 2013 || Oukaimeden || C. Rinner ||  || align=right | 3.1 km || 
|-id=087 bgcolor=#d6d6d6
| 543087 ||  || — || September 3, 2013 || ISON-Kislovodsk || V. Nevski ||  || align=right | 3.1 km || 
|-id=088 bgcolor=#d6d6d6
| 543088 ||  || — || October 23, 2008 || Mount Lemmon || Mount Lemmon Survey ||  || align=right | 2.1 km || 
|-id=089 bgcolor=#E9E9E9
| 543089 ||  || — || September 2, 2013 || Mount Lemmon || Mount Lemmon Survey ||  || align=right | 1.7 km || 
|-id=090 bgcolor=#d6d6d6
| 543090 ||  || — || September 2, 2013 || Mount Lemmon || Mount Lemmon Survey ||  || align=right | 2.1 km || 
|-id=091 bgcolor=#d6d6d6
| 543091 ||  || — || September 9, 2013 || Haleakala || Pan-STARRS ||  || align=right | 2.9 km || 
|-id=092 bgcolor=#d6d6d6
| 543092 ||  || — || November 16, 2009 || Kitt Peak || Spacewatch ||  || align=right | 2.6 km || 
|-id=093 bgcolor=#d6d6d6
| 543093 ||  || — || September 23, 2008 || Kitt Peak || Spacewatch ||  || align=right | 2.4 km || 
|-id=094 bgcolor=#d6d6d6
| 543094 ||  || — || April 2, 2005 || Mount Lemmon || Mount Lemmon Survey ||  || align=right | 2.9 km || 
|-id=095 bgcolor=#d6d6d6
| 543095 ||  || — || August 28, 2013 || Mount Lemmon || Mount Lemmon Survey ||  || align=right | 2.4 km || 
|-id=096 bgcolor=#E9E9E9
| 543096 ||  || — || January 5, 2011 || Catalina || CSS ||  || align=right | 1.9 km || 
|-id=097 bgcolor=#d6d6d6
| 543097 ||  || — || September 9, 2013 || Haleakala || Pan-STARRS ||  || align=right | 2.2 km || 
|-id=098 bgcolor=#d6d6d6
| 543098 ||  || — || September 14, 2013 || Haleakala || Pan-STARRS ||  || align=right | 2.6 km || 
|-id=099 bgcolor=#d6d6d6
| 543099 ||  || — || May 24, 2006 || Kitt Peak || Spacewatch ||  || align=right | 2.9 km || 
|-id=100 bgcolor=#d6d6d6
| 543100 ||  || — || September 14, 2013 || Haleakala || Pan-STARRS ||  || align=right | 2.9 km || 
|}

543101–543200 

|-bgcolor=#d6d6d6
| 543101 ||  || — || September 1, 2013 || Mount Lemmon || Mount Lemmon Survey ||  || align=right | 2.1 km || 
|-id=102 bgcolor=#d6d6d6
| 543102 ||  || — || September 12, 2002 || Palomar || NEAT || EOS || align=right | 1.8 km || 
|-id=103 bgcolor=#d6d6d6
| 543103 ||  || — || September 28, 2013 || Mount Lemmon || Mount Lemmon Survey ||  || align=right | 2.5 km || 
|-id=104 bgcolor=#d6d6d6
| 543104 ||  || — || October 20, 2003 || Kitt Peak || Spacewatch ||  || align=right | 1.9 km || 
|-id=105 bgcolor=#d6d6d6
| 543105 ||  || — || November 1, 2008 || Mount Lemmon || Mount Lemmon Survey ||  || align=right | 2.6 km || 
|-id=106 bgcolor=#d6d6d6
| 543106 ||  || — || November 21, 2008 || Kitt Peak || Spacewatch ||  || align=right | 2.5 km || 
|-id=107 bgcolor=#d6d6d6
| 543107 ||  || — || September 28, 2013 || Mount Lemmon || Mount Lemmon Survey ||  || align=right | 2.9 km || 
|-id=108 bgcolor=#d6d6d6
| 543108 ||  || — || August 10, 2007 || Kitt Peak || Spacewatch ||  || align=right | 2.6 km || 
|-id=109 bgcolor=#d6d6d6
| 543109 ||  || — || September 25, 2013 || Catalina || CSS ||  || align=right | 3.0 km || 
|-id=110 bgcolor=#d6d6d6
| 543110 ||  || — || September 30, 2013 || Mount Lemmon || Mount Lemmon Survey ||  || align=right | 2.9 km || 
|-id=111 bgcolor=#d6d6d6
| 543111 ||  || — || March 8, 2005 || Mount Lemmon || Mount Lemmon Survey ||  || align=right | 2.5 km || 
|-id=112 bgcolor=#d6d6d6
| 543112 ||  || — || February 17, 2010 || Kitt Peak || Spacewatch ||  || align=right | 2.9 km || 
|-id=113 bgcolor=#d6d6d6
| 543113 ||  || — || November 7, 2005 || Mauna Kea || Mauna Kea Obs. ||  || align=right | 2.9 km || 
|-id=114 bgcolor=#E9E9E9
| 543114 ||  || — || August 15, 2013 || Haleakala || Pan-STARRS ||  || align=right | 2.0 km || 
|-id=115 bgcolor=#d6d6d6
| 543115 ||  || — || February 14, 2010 || Mount Lemmon || Mount Lemmon Survey ||  || align=right | 2.5 km || 
|-id=116 bgcolor=#d6d6d6
| 543116 ||  || — || September 18, 2003 || Kitt Peak || Spacewatch ||  || align=right | 2.0 km || 
|-id=117 bgcolor=#d6d6d6
| 543117 ||  || — || August 13, 2013 || Kitt Peak || Spacewatch ||  || align=right | 2.8 km || 
|-id=118 bgcolor=#d6d6d6
| 543118 ||  || — || September 9, 2013 || Haleakala || Pan-STARRS ||  || align=right | 3.0 km || 
|-id=119 bgcolor=#fefefe
| 543119 ||  || — || August 12, 2013 || Kitt Peak || Spacewatch || H || align=right data-sort-value="0.71" | 710 m || 
|-id=120 bgcolor=#d6d6d6
| 543120 ||  || — || September 15, 2002 || Palomar || NEAT ||  || align=right | 2.9 km || 
|-id=121 bgcolor=#d6d6d6
| 543121 ||  || — || September 25, 2013 || Catalina || CSS ||  || align=right | 3.3 km || 
|-id=122 bgcolor=#d6d6d6
| 543122 ||  || — || October 23, 2008 || Kitt Peak || Spacewatch ||  || align=right | 2.1 km || 
|-id=123 bgcolor=#d6d6d6
| 543123 ||  || — || December 3, 2008 || Mount Lemmon || Mount Lemmon Survey ||  || align=right | 2.9 km || 
|-id=124 bgcolor=#d6d6d6
| 543124 ||  || — || November 14, 2002 || Palomar || NEAT ||  || align=right | 2.8 km || 
|-id=125 bgcolor=#d6d6d6
| 543125 ||  || — || October 26, 2008 || Mount Lemmon || Mount Lemmon Survey ||  || align=right | 2.7 km || 
|-id=126 bgcolor=#d6d6d6
| 543126 ||  || — || September 3, 2007 || Catalina || CSS || EUP || align=right | 3.1 km || 
|-id=127 bgcolor=#d6d6d6
| 543127 ||  || — || October 2, 2013 || Palomar || PTF ||  || align=right | 3.3 km || 
|-id=128 bgcolor=#d6d6d6
| 543128 ||  || — || November 21, 2008 || Kitt Peak || Spacewatch ||  || align=right | 3.2 km || 
|-id=129 bgcolor=#d6d6d6
| 543129 ||  || — || September 26, 2013 || Catalina || CSS ||  || align=right | 3.0 km || 
|-id=130 bgcolor=#d6d6d6
| 543130 ||  || — || November 20, 2008 || Kitt Peak || Spacewatch ||  || align=right | 2.6 km || 
|-id=131 bgcolor=#d6d6d6
| 543131 ||  || — || September 30, 2013 || Mount Lemmon || Mount Lemmon Survey ||  || align=right | 2.4 km || 
|-id=132 bgcolor=#fefefe
| 543132 ||  || — || March 27, 2012 || Haleakala || Pan-STARRS ||  || align=right data-sort-value="0.72" | 720 m || 
|-id=133 bgcolor=#d6d6d6
| 543133 ||  || — || September 13, 2002 || Palomar || NEAT ||  || align=right | 3.7 km || 
|-id=134 bgcolor=#d6d6d6
| 543134 ||  || — || October 3, 2013 || Elena Remote || A. Oreshko ||  || align=right | 2.3 km || 
|-id=135 bgcolor=#d6d6d6
| 543135 ||  || — || December 29, 2008 || Farra d'Isonzo || Farra d'Isonzo ||  || align=right | 2.5 km || 
|-id=136 bgcolor=#d6d6d6
| 543136 ||  || — || September 24, 2008 || Mount Lemmon || Mount Lemmon Survey ||  || align=right | 2.5 km || 
|-id=137 bgcolor=#d6d6d6
| 543137 ||  || — || October 1, 2013 || Kitt Peak || Spacewatch ||  || align=right | 2.7 km || 
|-id=138 bgcolor=#d6d6d6
| 543138 ||  || — || April 7, 2006 || Kitt Peak || Spacewatch ||  || align=right | 2.6 km || 
|-id=139 bgcolor=#d6d6d6
| 543139 ||  || — || November 25, 2002 || Palomar || NEAT || LIX || align=right | 3.3 km || 
|-id=140 bgcolor=#E9E9E9
| 543140 ||  || — || March 9, 2011 || Moletai || K. Černis ||  || align=right | 2.6 km || 
|-id=141 bgcolor=#d6d6d6
| 543141 ||  || — || October 24, 2008 || Kitt Peak || Spacewatch ||  || align=right | 2.2 km || 
|-id=142 bgcolor=#d6d6d6
| 543142 ||  || — || October 1, 2013 || Mount Lemmon || Mount Lemmon Survey ||  || align=right | 2.3 km || 
|-id=143 bgcolor=#d6d6d6
| 543143 ||  || — || October 1, 2013 || Kitt Peak || Spacewatch ||  || align=right | 2.8 km || 
|-id=144 bgcolor=#d6d6d6
| 543144 ||  || — || October 1, 2013 || Kitt Peak || Spacewatch ||  || align=right | 3.0 km || 
|-id=145 bgcolor=#d6d6d6
| 543145 ||  || — || July 14, 2013 || Haleakala || Pan-STARRS ||  || align=right | 3.0 km || 
|-id=146 bgcolor=#d6d6d6
| 543146 ||  || — || August 25, 2003 || Palomar || NEAT ||  || align=right | 3.3 km || 
|-id=147 bgcolor=#d6d6d6
| 543147 ||  || — || September 14, 2013 || Catalina || CSS ||  || align=right | 2.6 km || 
|-id=148 bgcolor=#d6d6d6
| 543148 ||  || — || September 15, 2013 || Catalina || CSS ||  || align=right | 3.7 km || 
|-id=149 bgcolor=#d6d6d6
| 543149 ||  || — || October 6, 1996 || Kitt Peak || Spacewatch ||  || align=right | 2.5 km || 
|-id=150 bgcolor=#d6d6d6
| 543150 ||  || — || September 25, 2013 || Catalina || CSS ||  || align=right | 3.3 km || 
|-id=151 bgcolor=#d6d6d6
| 543151 ||  || — || October 2, 2013 || Mount Lemmon || Mount Lemmon Survey ||  || align=right | 2.8 km || 
|-id=152 bgcolor=#d6d6d6
| 543152 ||  || — || November 8, 2008 || Mount Lemmon || Mount Lemmon Survey ||  || align=right | 2.3 km || 
|-id=153 bgcolor=#d6d6d6
| 543153 ||  || — || October 2, 2013 || Mount Lemmon || Mount Lemmon Survey ||  || align=right | 2.3 km || 
|-id=154 bgcolor=#d6d6d6
| 543154 ||  || — || October 3, 2013 || Palomar || PTF ||  || align=right | 3.5 km || 
|-id=155 bgcolor=#d6d6d6
| 543155 ||  || — || September 10, 2007 || Mount Lemmon || Mount Lemmon Survey || HYG || align=right | 2.4 km || 
|-id=156 bgcolor=#d6d6d6
| 543156 ||  || — || October 3, 2013 || Kitt Peak || Spacewatch ||  || align=right | 3.0 km || 
|-id=157 bgcolor=#d6d6d6
| 543157 ||  || — || April 28, 2011 || Haleakala || Pan-STARRS ||  || align=right | 3.2 km || 
|-id=158 bgcolor=#d6d6d6
| 543158 ||  || — || October 3, 2013 || Mount Lemmon || Mount Lemmon Survey ||  || align=right | 2.7 km || 
|-id=159 bgcolor=#d6d6d6
| 543159 ||  || — || September 13, 2013 || Crni Vrh || H. Mikuž ||  || align=right | 3.1 km || 
|-id=160 bgcolor=#d6d6d6
| 543160 ||  || — || September 29, 2008 || Kitt Peak || Spacewatch ||  || align=right | 2.0 km || 
|-id=161 bgcolor=#d6d6d6
| 543161 ||  || — || October 3, 2013 || Haleakala || Pan-STARRS ||  || align=right | 2.0 km || 
|-id=162 bgcolor=#d6d6d6
| 543162 ||  || — || October 21, 2008 || Kitt Peak || Spacewatch || EOS || align=right | 1.6 km || 
|-id=163 bgcolor=#d6d6d6
| 543163 ||  || — || October 4, 2013 || Kitt Peak || Spacewatch ||  || align=right | 3.9 km || 
|-id=164 bgcolor=#d6d6d6
| 543164 ||  || — || October 4, 2013 || Mount Lemmon || Mount Lemmon Survey ||  || align=right | 2.9 km || 
|-id=165 bgcolor=#E9E9E9
| 543165 ||  || — || January 30, 2012 || Mount Lemmon || Mount Lemmon Survey ||  || align=right | 1.7 km || 
|-id=166 bgcolor=#E9E9E9
| 543166 ||  || — || February 12, 2002 || Kitt Peak || Spacewatch ||  || align=right | 1.8 km || 
|-id=167 bgcolor=#d6d6d6
| 543167 ||  || — || October 4, 2013 || Catalina || CSS ||  || align=right | 3.2 km || 
|-id=168 bgcolor=#d6d6d6
| 543168 ||  || — || October 4, 2013 || Mount Lemmon || Mount Lemmon Survey ||  || align=right | 3.5 km || 
|-id=169 bgcolor=#d6d6d6
| 543169 ||  || — || September 13, 2013 || Mount Lemmon || Mount Lemmon Survey ||  || align=right | 3.0 km || 
|-id=170 bgcolor=#d6d6d6
| 543170 ||  || — || December 20, 2009 || Kitt Peak || Spacewatch ||  || align=right | 2.6 km || 
|-id=171 bgcolor=#d6d6d6
| 543171 ||  || — || October 10, 2008 || Mount Lemmon || Mount Lemmon Survey || EOS || align=right | 1.5 km || 
|-id=172 bgcolor=#d6d6d6
| 543172 ||  || — || January 8, 2011 || Mount Lemmon || Mount Lemmon Survey ||  || align=right | 2.5 km || 
|-id=173 bgcolor=#d6d6d6
| 543173 ||  || — || February 16, 2010 || Kitt Peak || Spacewatch ||  || align=right | 3.0 km || 
|-id=174 bgcolor=#d6d6d6
| 543174 ||  || — || May 19, 2012 || Mount Lemmon || Mount Lemmon Survey ||  || align=right | 3.5 km || 
|-id=175 bgcolor=#d6d6d6
| 543175 ||  || — || October 3, 2013 || Kitt Peak || Spacewatch ||  || align=right | 2.4 km || 
|-id=176 bgcolor=#d6d6d6
| 543176 ||  || — || November 13, 2002 || Palomar || NEAT ||  || align=right | 2.6 km || 
|-id=177 bgcolor=#d6d6d6
| 543177 ||  || — || October 3, 2013 || Haleakala || Pan-STARRS ||  || align=right | 2.8 km || 
|-id=178 bgcolor=#E9E9E9
| 543178 ||  || — || April 15, 2012 || Haleakala || Pan-STARRS ||  || align=right | 2.1 km || 
|-id=179 bgcolor=#d6d6d6
| 543179 ||  || — || October 4, 2007 || Mount Lemmon || Mount Lemmon Survey ||  || align=right | 2.8 km || 
|-id=180 bgcolor=#d6d6d6
| 543180 ||  || — || October 1, 2013 || Kitt Peak || Spacewatch ||  || align=right | 2.7 km || 
|-id=181 bgcolor=#d6d6d6
| 543181 ||  || — || February 14, 2010 || Calvin-Rehoboth || L. A. Molnar || EOS || align=right | 1.7 km || 
|-id=182 bgcolor=#d6d6d6
| 543182 ||  || — || October 1, 2013 || Kitt Peak || Spacewatch ||  || align=right | 2.5 km || 
|-id=183 bgcolor=#d6d6d6
| 543183 ||  || — || September 15, 2013 || Haleakala || Pan-STARRS ||  || align=right | 2.5 km || 
|-id=184 bgcolor=#d6d6d6
| 543184 ||  || — || October 1, 2013 || Kitt Peak || Spacewatch ||  || align=right | 2.7 km || 
|-id=185 bgcolor=#d6d6d6
| 543185 ||  || — || November 28, 2002 || Haleakala || AMOS ||  || align=right | 2.7 km || 
|-id=186 bgcolor=#d6d6d6
| 543186 ||  || — || March 8, 2005 || Kitt Peak || Spacewatch ||  || align=right | 3.9 km || 
|-id=187 bgcolor=#d6d6d6
| 543187 ||  || — || September 15, 2002 || Palomar || NEAT || EOS || align=right | 2.2 km || 
|-id=188 bgcolor=#d6d6d6
| 543188 ||  || — || May 4, 2005 || Mauna Kea || Mauna Kea Obs. || EOS || align=right | 1.8 km || 
|-id=189 bgcolor=#d6d6d6
| 543189 ||  || — || December 5, 2008 || Mount Lemmon || Mount Lemmon Survey ||  || align=right | 2.0 km || 
|-id=190 bgcolor=#d6d6d6
| 543190 ||  || — || July 16, 2013 || Haleakala || Pan-STARRS ||  || align=right | 3.0 km || 
|-id=191 bgcolor=#d6d6d6
| 543191 ||  || — || September 11, 2007 || Kitt Peak || Spacewatch || THM || align=right | 2.3 km || 
|-id=192 bgcolor=#fefefe
| 543192 ||  || — || April 28, 2012 || Kitt Peak || Spacewatch ||  || align=right data-sort-value="0.72" | 720 m || 
|-id=193 bgcolor=#d6d6d6
| 543193 ||  || — || October 3, 2013 || Kitt Peak || Spacewatch ||  || align=right | 2.9 km || 
|-id=194 bgcolor=#d6d6d6
| 543194 ||  || — || December 5, 2008 || Kitt Peak || Spacewatch ||  || align=right | 3.0 km || 
|-id=195 bgcolor=#d6d6d6
| 543195 ||  || — || April 21, 2007 || Cerro Tololo || L. H. Wasserman ||  || align=right | 2.9 km || 
|-id=196 bgcolor=#d6d6d6
| 543196 ||  || — || June 2, 2011 || Haleakala || Pan-STARRS ||  || align=right | 2.7 km || 
|-id=197 bgcolor=#d6d6d6
| 543197 ||  || — || March 19, 2010 || Catalina || CSS ||  || align=right | 3.9 km || 
|-id=198 bgcolor=#d6d6d6
| 543198 Rastislavmráz ||  ||  || September 5, 2013 || Piszkesteto || T. Csörgei, K. Sárneczky ||  || align=right | 3.3 km || 
|-id=199 bgcolor=#d6d6d6
| 543199 ||  || — || September 12, 2002 || Palomar || NEAT ||  || align=right | 2.0 km || 
|-id=200 bgcolor=#d6d6d6
| 543200 ||  || — || September 15, 2013 || Haleakala || Pan-STARRS || HYG || align=right | 2.6 km || 
|}

543201–543300 

|-bgcolor=#FA8072
| 543201 ||  || — || October 15, 2007 || Kitt Peak || Spacewatch ||  || align=right data-sort-value="0.52" | 520 m || 
|-id=202 bgcolor=#E9E9E9
| 543202 ||  || — || September 7, 2008 || Mount Lemmon || Mount Lemmon Survey ||  || align=right | 1.9 km || 
|-id=203 bgcolor=#d6d6d6
| 543203 ||  || — || June 16, 2012 || Kitt Peak || Spacewatch ||  || align=right | 3.4 km || 
|-id=204 bgcolor=#d6d6d6
| 543204 ||  || — || May 20, 2006 || Mount Lemmon || Mount Lemmon Survey ||  || align=right | 2.9 km || 
|-id=205 bgcolor=#d6d6d6
| 543205 ||  || — || May 22, 2006 || Kitt Peak || Spacewatch ||  || align=right | 3.4 km || 
|-id=206 bgcolor=#d6d6d6
| 543206 ||  || — || September 10, 2013 || Haleakala || Pan-STARRS || EOS || align=right | 1.9 km || 
|-id=207 bgcolor=#d6d6d6
| 543207 ||  || — || November 9, 2008 || Mount Lemmon || Mount Lemmon Survey ||  || align=right | 2.3 km || 
|-id=208 bgcolor=#d6d6d6
| 543208 ||  || — || December 5, 2008 || Mount Lemmon || Mount Lemmon Survey ||  || align=right | 2.1 km || 
|-id=209 bgcolor=#d6d6d6
| 543209 ||  || — || September 5, 2013 || Kitt Peak || Spacewatch ||  || align=right | 2.4 km || 
|-id=210 bgcolor=#d6d6d6
| 543210 ||  || — || March 27, 2011 || Mount Lemmon || Mount Lemmon Survey ||  || align=right | 3.4 km || 
|-id=211 bgcolor=#d6d6d6
| 543211 ||  || — || August 13, 2007 || Siding Spring || SSS || Tj (2.99) || align=right | 3.2 km || 
|-id=212 bgcolor=#d6d6d6
| 543212 ||  || — || September 20, 2007 || Kitt Peak || Spacewatch ||  || align=right | 3.0 km || 
|-id=213 bgcolor=#d6d6d6
| 543213 ||  || — || September 27, 2013 || Haleakala || Pan-STARRS ||  || align=right | 2.7 km || 
|-id=214 bgcolor=#d6d6d6
| 543214 ||  || — || September 13, 2013 || Catalina || CSS ||  || align=right | 2.9 km || 
|-id=215 bgcolor=#d6d6d6
| 543215 ||  || — || November 22, 2009 || Kitt Peak || Spacewatch ||  || align=right | 1.8 km || 
|-id=216 bgcolor=#d6d6d6
| 543216 ||  || — || September 3, 2008 || Kitt Peak || Spacewatch ||  || align=right | 2.4 km || 
|-id=217 bgcolor=#d6d6d6
| 543217 ||  || — || October 14, 2013 || Mount Lemmon || Mount Lemmon Survey ||  || align=right | 2.5 km || 
|-id=218 bgcolor=#d6d6d6
| 543218 ||  || — || August 10, 2007 || Kitt Peak || Spacewatch ||  || align=right | 2.5 km || 
|-id=219 bgcolor=#d6d6d6
| 543219 ||  || — || October 3, 2013 || Kitt Peak || Spacewatch ||  || align=right | 2.1 km || 
|-id=220 bgcolor=#d6d6d6
| 543220 ||  || — || October 1, 2013 || Kitt Peak || Spacewatch ||  || align=right | 2.5 km || 
|-id=221 bgcolor=#d6d6d6
| 543221 ||  || — || March 25, 2011 || Kitt Peak || Spacewatch ||  || align=right | 2.4 km || 
|-id=222 bgcolor=#d6d6d6
| 543222 ||  || — || October 2, 2008 || Mount Lemmon || Mount Lemmon Survey ||  || align=right | 2.4 km || 
|-id=223 bgcolor=#d6d6d6
| 543223 ||  || — || October 3, 2013 || Haleakala || Pan-STARRS ||  || align=right | 2.9 km || 
|-id=224 bgcolor=#d6d6d6
| 543224 ||  || — || October 6, 2013 || Kitt Peak || Spacewatch ||  || align=right | 2.9 km || 
|-id=225 bgcolor=#d6d6d6
| 543225 ||  || — || October 13, 2013 || Kitt Peak || Spacewatch ||  || align=right | 2.2 km || 
|-id=226 bgcolor=#E9E9E9
| 543226 ||  || — || October 3, 2013 || Kitt Peak || Spacewatch ||  || align=right | 1.4 km || 
|-id=227 bgcolor=#fefefe
| 543227 ||  || — || January 20, 2012 || Haleakala || Pan-STARRS || H || align=right data-sort-value="0.57" | 570 m || 
|-id=228 bgcolor=#d6d6d6
| 543228 ||  || — || October 12, 2013 || Catalina || CSS ||  || align=right | 2.2 km || 
|-id=229 bgcolor=#d6d6d6
| 543229 ||  || — || October 3, 2013 || Haleakala || Pan-STARRS ||  || align=right | 3.4 km || 
|-id=230 bgcolor=#d6d6d6
| 543230 ||  || — || April 22, 2007 || Kitt Peak || Spacewatch ||  || align=right | 2.7 km || 
|-id=231 bgcolor=#d6d6d6
| 543231 ||  || — || July 20, 2013 || Haleakala || Pan-STARRS || Tj (2.99) || align=right | 3.6 km || 
|-id=232 bgcolor=#d6d6d6
| 543232 ||  || — || September 10, 2007 || Catalina || CSS ||  || align=right | 3.4 km || 
|-id=233 bgcolor=#d6d6d6
| 543233 ||  || — || October 24, 2013 || Palomar || PTF ||  || align=right | 2.4 km || 
|-id=234 bgcolor=#d6d6d6
| 543234 ||  || — || October 13, 2013 || Mount Lemmon || Mount Lemmon Survey || EOS || align=right | 2.3 km || 
|-id=235 bgcolor=#d6d6d6
| 543235 ||  || — || September 30, 2013 || Catalina || CSS ||  || align=right | 2.7 km || 
|-id=236 bgcolor=#d6d6d6
| 543236 ||  || — || May 26, 2011 || Mount Lemmon || Mount Lemmon Survey ||  || align=right | 2.7 km || 
|-id=237 bgcolor=#d6d6d6
| 543237 ||  || — || October 5, 2013 || Haleakala || Pan-STARRS ||  || align=right | 2.8 km || 
|-id=238 bgcolor=#d6d6d6
| 543238 ||  || — || October 2, 2002 || Haleakala || AMOS ||  || align=right | 2.5 km || 
|-id=239 bgcolor=#d6d6d6
| 543239 ||  || — || March 28, 2011 || Mount Lemmon || Mount Lemmon Survey ||  || align=right | 3.2 km || 
|-id=240 bgcolor=#d6d6d6
| 543240 ||  || — || May 8, 2005 || Kitt Peak || Spacewatch ||  || align=right | 3.1 km || 
|-id=241 bgcolor=#d6d6d6
| 543241 ||  || — || October 26, 2013 || Mount Lemmon || Mount Lemmon Survey ||  || align=right | 2.1 km || 
|-id=242 bgcolor=#d6d6d6
| 543242 ||  || — || November 1, 2013 || Catalina || CSS ||  || align=right | 2.9 km || 
|-id=243 bgcolor=#d6d6d6
| 543243 ||  || — || November 2, 2013 || Elena Remote || A. Oreshko ||  || align=right | 2.4 km || 
|-id=244 bgcolor=#FA8072
| 543244 ||  || — || May 28, 2009 || Mount Lemmon || Mount Lemmon Survey ||  || align=right data-sort-value="0.60" | 600 m || 
|-id=245 bgcolor=#d6d6d6
| 543245 ||  || — || September 30, 2013 || Mount Lemmon || Mount Lemmon Survey ||  || align=right | 3.2 km || 
|-id=246 bgcolor=#d6d6d6
| 543246 ||  || — || May 3, 2006 || Kitt Peak || Spacewatch || TIR || align=right | 3.5 km || 
|-id=247 bgcolor=#d6d6d6
| 543247 ||  || — || March 9, 2005 || Vail-Jarnac || Jarnac Obs. ||  || align=right | 3.0 km || 
|-id=248 bgcolor=#FA8072
| 543248 ||  || — || September 28, 2003 || Anderson Mesa || LONEOS ||  || align=right data-sort-value="0.68" | 680 m || 
|-id=249 bgcolor=#d6d6d6
| 543249 ||  || — || October 15, 2013 || Nogales || M. Schwartz, P. R. Holvorcem ||  || align=right | 3.5 km || 
|-id=250 bgcolor=#d6d6d6
| 543250 ||  || — || October 2, 2013 || Kitt Peak || Spacewatch ||  || align=right | 2.5 km || 
|-id=251 bgcolor=#d6d6d6
| 543251 ||  || — || December 3, 2008 || Kitt Peak || Spacewatch ||  || align=right | 2.0 km || 
|-id=252 bgcolor=#d6d6d6
| 543252 ||  || — || November 7, 2013 || Kitt Peak || Spacewatch ||  || align=right | 3.2 km || 
|-id=253 bgcolor=#d6d6d6
| 543253 ||  || — || August 24, 2007 || Kitt Peak || Spacewatch ||  || align=right | 2.0 km || 
|-id=254 bgcolor=#d6d6d6
| 543254 ||  || — || November 9, 2013 || Mount Lemmon || Mount Lemmon Survey ||  || align=right | 3.2 km || 
|-id=255 bgcolor=#d6d6d6
| 543255 ||  || — || November 2, 2013 || Catalina || CSS ||  || align=right | 2.3 km || 
|-id=256 bgcolor=#d6d6d6
| 543256 ||  || — || October 14, 2013 || Mount Lemmon || Mount Lemmon Survey ||  || align=right | 2.9 km || 
|-id=257 bgcolor=#d6d6d6
| 543257 ||  || — || March 3, 2005 || Kitt Peak || Spacewatch ||  || align=right | 2.9 km || 
|-id=258 bgcolor=#d6d6d6
| 543258 ||  || — || October 9, 2013 || Mount Lemmon || Mount Lemmon Survey ||  || align=right | 2.9 km || 
|-id=259 bgcolor=#d6d6d6
| 543259 ||  || — || October 9, 2013 || Mount Lemmon || Mount Lemmon Survey || EOS || align=right | 1.9 km || 
|-id=260 bgcolor=#d6d6d6
| 543260 ||  || — || November 10, 2013 || Mount Lemmon || Mount Lemmon Survey ||  || align=right | 3.1 km || 
|-id=261 bgcolor=#fefefe
| 543261 ||  || — || October 22, 2006 || Kitt Peak || Spacewatch ||  || align=right data-sort-value="0.72" | 720 m || 
|-id=262 bgcolor=#fefefe
| 543262 ||  || — || December 13, 2006 || Mount Lemmon || Mount Lemmon Survey ||  || align=right data-sort-value="0.87" | 870 m || 
|-id=263 bgcolor=#d6d6d6
| 543263 ||  || — || March 18, 2010 || Mount Lemmon || Mount Lemmon Survey ||  || align=right | 2.4 km || 
|-id=264 bgcolor=#d6d6d6
| 543264 ||  || — || October 16, 2007 || Catalina || CSS || Tj (2.99) || align=right | 3.4 km || 
|-id=265 bgcolor=#fefefe
| 543265 ||  || — || November 2, 2013 || Kitt Peak || Spacewatch ||  || align=right data-sort-value="0.65" | 650 m || 
|-id=266 bgcolor=#d6d6d6
| 543266 ||  || — || November 26, 2013 || Haleakala || Pan-STARRS ||  || align=right | 2.8 km || 
|-id=267 bgcolor=#d6d6d6
| 543267 ||  || — || September 13, 2007 || Mount Lemmon || Mount Lemmon Survey ||  || align=right | 2.8 km || 
|-id=268 bgcolor=#d6d6d6
| 543268 ||  || — || November 28, 2013 || Mount Lemmon || Mount Lemmon Survey ||  || align=right | 3.2 km || 
|-id=269 bgcolor=#d6d6d6
| 543269 ||  || — || November 28, 2013 || Mount Lemmon || Mount Lemmon Survey ||  || align=right | 2.4 km || 
|-id=270 bgcolor=#d6d6d6
| 543270 ||  || — || December 3, 2008 || Mount Lemmon || Mount Lemmon Survey ||  || align=right | 3.2 km || 
|-id=271 bgcolor=#d6d6d6
| 543271 ||  || — || February 20, 2009 || Kitt Peak || Spacewatch || 7:4 || align=right | 3.0 km || 
|-id=272 bgcolor=#d6d6d6
| 543272 ||  || — || August 20, 2012 || Charleston || R. Holmes ||  || align=right | 2.8 km || 
|-id=273 bgcolor=#d6d6d6
| 543273 ||  || — || November 26, 2013 || Nogales || M. Schwartz, P. R. Holvorcem ||  || align=right | 3.3 km || 
|-id=274 bgcolor=#d6d6d6
| 543274 ||  || — || November 27, 2013 || Haleakala || Pan-STARRS ||  || align=right | 2.3 km || 
|-id=275 bgcolor=#d6d6d6
| 543275 ||  || — || June 1, 2011 || ESA OGS || ESA OGS ||  || align=right | 4.0 km || 
|-id=276 bgcolor=#d6d6d6
| 543276 ||  || — || August 15, 2007 || Crni Vrh || J. Skvarč ||  || align=right | 3.4 km || 
|-id=277 bgcolor=#E9E9E9
| 543277 ||  || — || October 14, 2013 || Mount Lemmon || Mount Lemmon Survey ||  || align=right data-sort-value="0.71" | 710 m || 
|-id=278 bgcolor=#d6d6d6
| 543278 ||  || — || October 4, 2007 || Catalina || CSS ||  || align=right | 3.2 km || 
|-id=279 bgcolor=#d6d6d6
| 543279 ||  || — || November 26, 2013 || Haleakala || Pan-STARRS ||  || align=right | 2.4 km || 
|-id=280 bgcolor=#d6d6d6
| 543280 ||  || — || July 22, 2007 || Lulin || LUSS ||  || align=right | 2.8 km || 
|-id=281 bgcolor=#d6d6d6
| 543281 ||  || — || October 8, 2013 || Mount Lemmon || Mount Lemmon Survey ||  || align=right | 3.0 km || 
|-id=282 bgcolor=#d6d6d6
| 543282 ||  || — || November 26, 2013 || Mount Lemmon || Mount Lemmon Survey ||  || align=right | 2.4 km || 
|-id=283 bgcolor=#fefefe
| 543283 ||  || — || March 26, 2009 || Kitt Peak || Spacewatch ||  || align=right data-sort-value="0.59" | 590 m || 
|-id=284 bgcolor=#d6d6d6
| 543284 ||  || — || September 12, 2013 || Mount Lemmon || Mount Lemmon Survey ||  || align=right | 2.9 km || 
|-id=285 bgcolor=#d6d6d6
| 543285 ||  || — || November 1, 2013 || Kitt Peak || Spacewatch || EOS || align=right | 2.1 km || 
|-id=286 bgcolor=#d6d6d6
| 543286 ||  || — || October 9, 2013 || Mount Lemmon || Mount Lemmon Survey || TIR || align=right | 2.9 km || 
|-id=287 bgcolor=#d6d6d6
| 543287 ||  || — || November 20, 2008 || Mount Lemmon || Mount Lemmon Survey ||  || align=right | 3.0 km || 
|-id=288 bgcolor=#d6d6d6
| 543288 ||  || — || November 27, 2013 || Haleakala || Pan-STARRS ||  || align=right | 3.0 km || 
|-id=289 bgcolor=#fefefe
| 543289 ||  || — || November 19, 2003 || Kitt Peak || Spacewatch ||  || align=right data-sort-value="0.91" | 910 m || 
|-id=290 bgcolor=#d6d6d6
| 543290 ||  || — || November 28, 2013 || Kitt Peak || Spacewatch ||  || align=right | 2.3 km || 
|-id=291 bgcolor=#d6d6d6
| 543291 ||  || — || November 28, 2013 || Mount Lemmon || Mount Lemmon Survey ||  || align=right | 2.8 km || 
|-id=292 bgcolor=#d6d6d6
| 543292 ||  || — || October 9, 2013 || Mount Lemmon || Mount Lemmon Survey ||  || align=right | 2.3 km || 
|-id=293 bgcolor=#d6d6d6
| 543293 ||  || — || December 31, 2008 || Mount Lemmon || Mount Lemmon Survey || EOS || align=right | 1.9 km || 
|-id=294 bgcolor=#d6d6d6
| 543294 ||  || — || August 10, 2012 || Kitt Peak || Spacewatch ||  || align=right | 3.4 km || 
|-id=295 bgcolor=#d6d6d6
| 543295 ||  || — || October 11, 2007 || Catalina || CSS ||  || align=right | 2.8 km || 
|-id=296 bgcolor=#d6d6d6
| 543296 ||  || — || October 3, 2013 || Kitt Peak || Spacewatch ||  || align=right | 2.9 km || 
|-id=297 bgcolor=#d6d6d6
| 543297 ||  || — || January 20, 2009 || Mount Lemmon || Mount Lemmon Survey ||  || align=right | 2.5 km || 
|-id=298 bgcolor=#d6d6d6
| 543298 ||  || — || November 1, 2013 || Catalina || CSS ||  || align=right | 2.3 km || 
|-id=299 bgcolor=#d6d6d6
| 543299 ||  || — || November 7, 2013 || Kitt Peak || Spacewatch ||  || align=right | 2.4 km || 
|-id=300 bgcolor=#d6d6d6
| 543300 ||  || — || November 10, 2013 || Mount Lemmon || Mount Lemmon Survey ||  || align=right | 1.8 km || 
|}

543301–543400 

|-bgcolor=#d6d6d6
| 543301 ||  || — || November 11, 2013 || Catalina || CSS || EOS || align=right | 2.2 km || 
|-id=302 bgcolor=#d6d6d6
| 543302 Hamvasbéla ||  ||  || December 4, 2013 || Piszkesteto || K. Sárneczky, P. Székely ||  || align=right | 3.3 km || 
|-id=303 bgcolor=#d6d6d6
| 543303 ||  || — || November 27, 2013 || Haleakala || Pan-STARRS ||  || align=right | 3.7 km || 
|-id=304 bgcolor=#d6d6d6
| 543304 ||  || — || November 28, 2013 || Kitt Peak || Spacewatch ||  || align=right | 3.3 km || 
|-id=305 bgcolor=#d6d6d6
| 543305 ||  || — || November 28, 2013 || Mount Lemmon || Mount Lemmon Survey ||  || align=right | 2.4 km || 
|-id=306 bgcolor=#d6d6d6
| 543306 ||  || — || November 5, 2007 || Mount Lemmon || Mount Lemmon Survey ||  || align=right | 3.5 km || 
|-id=307 bgcolor=#fefefe
| 543307 ||  || — || December 14, 2013 || Haleakala || Pan-STARRS ||  || align=right data-sort-value="0.67" | 670 m || 
|-id=308 bgcolor=#d6d6d6
| 543308 ||  || — || December 10, 2013 || Wildberg || R. Apitzsch ||  || align=right | 2.3 km || 
|-id=309 bgcolor=#d6d6d6
| 543309 ||  || — || September 11, 2007 || Catalina || CSS ||  || align=right | 3.4 km || 
|-id=310 bgcolor=#d6d6d6
| 543310 ||  || — || December 14, 2013 || Mount Lemmon || Mount Lemmon Survey ||  || align=right | 3.5 km || 
|-id=311 bgcolor=#d6d6d6
| 543311 ||  || — || June 3, 2011 || Mount Lemmon || Mount Lemmon Survey ||  || align=right | 3.0 km || 
|-id=312 bgcolor=#d6d6d6
| 543312 ||  || — || October 9, 2007 || Kitt Peak || Spacewatch ||  || align=right | 3.0 km || 
|-id=313 bgcolor=#d6d6d6
| 543313 ||  || — || October 10, 2002 || Palomar || NEAT ||  || align=right | 2.6 km || 
|-id=314 bgcolor=#d6d6d6
| 543314 ||  || — || November 28, 2013 || Mount Lemmon || Mount Lemmon Survey ||  || align=right | 2.7 km || 
|-id=315 bgcolor=#d6d6d6
| 543315 Asmakhammari ||  ||  || December 10, 2013 || Oukaimeden || M. Ory ||  || align=right | 3.5 km || 
|-id=316 bgcolor=#E9E9E9
| 543316 ||  || — || November 6, 2013 || Mount Lemmon || Mount Lemmon Survey ||  || align=right | 1.5 km || 
|-id=317 bgcolor=#fefefe
| 543317 ||  || — || August 27, 2006 || Pises || Pises Obs. ||  || align=right data-sort-value="0.68" | 680 m || 
|-id=318 bgcolor=#d6d6d6
| 543318 ||  || — || March 12, 2010 || Mount Lemmon || Mount Lemmon Survey ||  || align=right | 2.7 km || 
|-id=319 bgcolor=#FFC2E0
| 543319 ||  || — || December 28, 2013 || Catalina || CSS || APO || align=right data-sort-value="0.34" | 340 m || 
|-id=320 bgcolor=#d6d6d6
| 543320 ||  || — || May 23, 2004 || Kitt Peak || Spacewatch ||  || align=right | 4.2 km || 
|-id=321 bgcolor=#fefefe
| 543321 ||  || — || September 28, 2009 || Mount Lemmon || Mount Lemmon Survey ||  || align=right | 1.0 km || 
|-id=322 bgcolor=#d6d6d6
| 543322 ||  || — || November 26, 2013 || Mount Lemmon || Mount Lemmon Survey ||  || align=right | 2.7 km || 
|-id=323 bgcolor=#d6d6d6
| 543323 ||  || — || September 29, 2000 || Kitt Peak || Spacewatch ||  || align=right | 4.1 km || 
|-id=324 bgcolor=#d6d6d6
| 543324 ||  || — || December 28, 2013 || Kitt Peak || Spacewatch ||  || align=right | 3.7 km || 
|-id=325 bgcolor=#fefefe
| 543325 ||  || — || July 25, 2003 || Palomar || NEAT ||  || align=right data-sort-value="0.70" | 700 m || 
|-id=326 bgcolor=#d6d6d6
| 543326 ||  || — || February 12, 2009 || Calar Alto || F. Hormuth, J. C. Datson ||  || align=right | 2.8 km || 
|-id=327 bgcolor=#d6d6d6
| 543327 ||  || — || December 30, 2013 || Kitt Peak || Spacewatch ||  || align=right | 2.3 km || 
|-id=328 bgcolor=#d6d6d6
| 543328 ||  || — || July 5, 2010 || Mount Lemmon || Mount Lemmon Survey ||  || align=right | 3.2 km || 
|-id=329 bgcolor=#fefefe
| 543329 ||  || — || December 17, 2009 || Kitt Peak || Spacewatch ||  || align=right data-sort-value="0.71" | 710 m || 
|-id=330 bgcolor=#d6d6d6
| 543330 ||  || — || June 26, 2011 || Mount Lemmon || Mount Lemmon Survey ||  || align=right | 3.3 km || 
|-id=331 bgcolor=#d6d6d6
| 543331 ||  || — || November 4, 2002 || Kitt Peak || Spacewatch ||  || align=right | 3.7 km || 
|-id=332 bgcolor=#d6d6d6
| 543332 ||  || — || November 28, 2013 || Mount Lemmon || Mount Lemmon Survey || 7:4 || align=right | 3.7 km || 
|-id=333 bgcolor=#d6d6d6
| 543333 ||  || — || October 10, 2007 || Catalina || CSS ||  || align=right | 4.0 km || 
|-id=334 bgcolor=#d6d6d6
| 543334 ||  || — || December 4, 2013 || Haleakala || Pan-STARRS ||  || align=right | 2.3 km || 
|-id=335 bgcolor=#d6d6d6
| 543335 ||  || — || January 1, 2014 || Haleakala || Pan-STARRS ||  || align=right | 2.2 km || 
|-id=336 bgcolor=#d6d6d6
| 543336 ||  || — || September 19, 2006 || Kitt Peak || Spacewatch ||  || align=right | 2.5 km || 
|-id=337 bgcolor=#d6d6d6
| 543337 ||  || — || February 18, 2004 || La Silla || Astrovirtel ||  || align=right | 3.1 km || 
|-id=338 bgcolor=#d6d6d6
| 543338 ||  || — || January 1, 2014 || Mount Lemmon || Mount Lemmon Survey ||  || align=right | 2.8 km || 
|-id=339 bgcolor=#d6d6d6
| 543339 ||  || — || July 21, 2001 || Palomar || NEAT ||  || align=right | 3.9 km || 
|-id=340 bgcolor=#d6d6d6
| 543340 ||  || — || January 1, 2014 || Mount Lemmon || Mount Lemmon Survey ||  || align=right | 2.6 km || 
|-id=341 bgcolor=#d6d6d6
| 543341 ||  || — || April 19, 2010 || Bergisch Gladbach || W. Bickel ||  || align=right | 3.1 km || 
|-id=342 bgcolor=#E9E9E9
| 543342 ||  || — || March 25, 2007 || Mount Lemmon || Mount Lemmon Survey ||  || align=right | 2.0 km || 
|-id=343 bgcolor=#d6d6d6
| 543343 ||  || — || January 15, 2009 || Kitt Peak || Spacewatch ||  || align=right | 3.2 km || 
|-id=344 bgcolor=#d6d6d6
| 543344 ||  || — || December 30, 2013 || Kitt Peak || Spacewatch ||  || align=right | 3.0 km || 
|-id=345 bgcolor=#d6d6d6
| 543345 ||  || — || November 4, 2007 || Kitt Peak || Spacewatch ||  || align=right | 3.5 km || 
|-id=346 bgcolor=#d6d6d6
| 543346 ||  || — || December 1, 2008 || Kitt Peak || Spacewatch ||  || align=right | 1.9 km || 
|-id=347 bgcolor=#d6d6d6
| 543347 ||  || — || December 24, 2013 || Mount Lemmon || Mount Lemmon Survey ||  || align=right | 3.3 km || 
|-id=348 bgcolor=#d6d6d6
| 543348 ||  || — || January 3, 2008 || Catalina || CSS || THB || align=right | 3.3 km || 
|-id=349 bgcolor=#d6d6d6
| 543349 ||  || — || January 20, 2009 || Mount Lemmon || Mount Lemmon Survey ||  || align=right | 2.2 km || 
|-id=350 bgcolor=#d6d6d6
| 543350 ||  || — || July 30, 2000 || Cerro Tololo || M. W. Buie, S. D. Kern ||  || align=right | 3.1 km || 
|-id=351 bgcolor=#d6d6d6
| 543351 ||  || — || December 30, 2013 || Kitt Peak || Spacewatch ||  || align=right | 2.3 km || 
|-id=352 bgcolor=#d6d6d6
| 543352 ||  || — || December 27, 2013 || Kitt Peak || Spacewatch ||  || align=right | 2.8 km || 
|-id=353 bgcolor=#d6d6d6
| 543353 ||  || — || February 1, 2003 || Palomar || NEAT ||  || align=right | 3.4 km || 
|-id=354 bgcolor=#C2E0FF
| 543354 ||  || — || January 25, 2014 || Haleakala || Pan-STARRS || SDO || align=right | 581 km || 
|-id=355 bgcolor=#d6d6d6
| 543355 ||  || — || January 7, 2014 || Mount Lemmon || Mount Lemmon Survey ||  || align=right | 3.4 km || 
|-id=356 bgcolor=#d6d6d6
| 543356 ||  || — || October 28, 2013 || Mount Lemmon || Mount Lemmon Survey || Tj (2.97) || align=right | 3.4 km || 
|-id=357 bgcolor=#fefefe
| 543357 ||  || — || March 5, 2008 || Mount Lemmon || Mount Lemmon Survey ||  || align=right data-sort-value="0.86" | 860 m || 
|-id=358 bgcolor=#d6d6d6
| 543358 ||  || — || February 28, 2003 || Haleakala || AMOS ||  || align=right | 3.7 km || 
|-id=359 bgcolor=#fefefe
| 543359 ||  || — || January 21, 2014 || Haleakala || Pan-STARRS || H || align=right data-sort-value="0.62" | 620 m || 
|-id=360 bgcolor=#d6d6d6
| 543360 ||  || — || January 21, 2014 || Mount Lemmon || Mount Lemmon Survey ||  || align=right | 3.0 km || 
|-id=361 bgcolor=#d6d6d6
| 543361 ||  || — || December 30, 2013 || Mount Lemmon || Mount Lemmon Survey ||  || align=right | 2.8 km || 
|-id=362 bgcolor=#d6d6d6
| 543362 ||  || — || December 7, 2002 || Kitt Peak || Spacewatch ||  || align=right | 2.7 km || 
|-id=363 bgcolor=#d6d6d6
| 543363 ||  || — || December 18, 2007 || Mount Lemmon || Mount Lemmon Survey ||  || align=right | 2.9 km || 
|-id=364 bgcolor=#d6d6d6
| 543364 ||  || — || July 31, 2005 || Bergisch Gladbach || W. Bickel || TIR || align=right | 3.8 km || 
|-id=365 bgcolor=#d6d6d6
| 543365 ||  || — || February 3, 2009 || Mount Lemmon || Mount Lemmon Survey ||  || align=right | 3.2 km || 
|-id=366 bgcolor=#d6d6d6
| 543366 ||  || — || January 23, 2014 || Mount Lemmon || Mount Lemmon Survey ||  || align=right | 3.1 km || 
|-id=367 bgcolor=#d6d6d6
| 543367 ||  || — || November 16, 2007 || Charleston || R. Holmes ||  || align=right | 3.6 km || 
|-id=368 bgcolor=#d6d6d6
| 543368 ||  || — || July 31, 2000 || Cerro Tololo || M. W. Buie, S. D. Kern ||  || align=right | 2.8 km || 
|-id=369 bgcolor=#d6d6d6
| 543369 ||  || — || November 26, 2013 || Mount Lemmon || Mount Lemmon Survey ||  || align=right | 2.6 km || 
|-id=370 bgcolor=#d6d6d6
| 543370 ||  || — || October 12, 2007 || Goodricke-Pigott || R. A. Tucker ||  || align=right | 2.4 km || 
|-id=371 bgcolor=#d6d6d6
| 543371 ||  || — || January 25, 2003 || Pla D'Arguines || R. Ferrando ||  || align=right | 3.2 km || 
|-id=372 bgcolor=#d6d6d6
| 543372 ||  || — || December 15, 2007 || Mount Lemmon || Mount Lemmon Survey ||  || align=right | 2.3 km || 
|-id=373 bgcolor=#d6d6d6
| 543373 ||  || — || November 1, 2013 || Mount Lemmon || Mount Lemmon Survey ||  || align=right | 3.1 km || 
|-id=374 bgcolor=#fefefe
| 543374 ||  || — || March 11, 2011 || Kitt Peak || Spacewatch ||  || align=right data-sort-value="0.62" | 620 m || 
|-id=375 bgcolor=#C2E0FF
| 543375 ||  || — || January 20, 2015 || Haleakala || Pan-STARRS || cubewano (hot) || align=right | 301 km || 
|-id=376 bgcolor=#C2E0FF
| 543376 ||  || — || January 21, 2014 || Haleakala || Pan-STARRS || SDO || align=right | 267 km || 
|-id=377 bgcolor=#C2E0FF
| 543377 ||  || — || January 5, 2014 || Haleakala || Pan-STARRS || centaur || align=right | 54 km || 
|-id=378 bgcolor=#d6d6d6
| 543378 ||  || — || March 18, 2015 || Haleakala || Pan-STARRS ||  || align=right | 2.3 km || 
|-id=379 bgcolor=#d6d6d6
| 543379 ||  || — || January 26, 2015 || Haleakala || Pan-STARRS ||  || align=right | 2.9 km || 
|-id=380 bgcolor=#d6d6d6
| 543380 ||  || — || January 28, 2014 || Kitt Peak || Spacewatch ||  || align=right | 2.6 km || 
|-id=381 bgcolor=#d6d6d6
| 543381 ||  || — || August 4, 2005 || Palomar || NEAT ||  || align=right | 4.0 km || 
|-id=382 bgcolor=#d6d6d6
| 543382 ||  || — || March 26, 2003 || Kitt Peak || Spacewatch ||  || align=right | 3.0 km || 
|-id=383 bgcolor=#d6d6d6
| 543383 ||  || — || February 12, 2008 || Mount Lemmon || Mount Lemmon Survey || 7:4 || align=right | 3.3 km || 
|-id=384 bgcolor=#d6d6d6
| 543384 ||  || — || January 25, 2014 || Haleakala || Pan-STARRS ||  || align=right | 2.6 km || 
|-id=385 bgcolor=#E9E9E9
| 543385 ||  || — || February 8, 2014 || Mount Lemmon || Mount Lemmon Survey ||  || align=right | 1.5 km || 
|-id=386 bgcolor=#d6d6d6
| 543386 ||  || — || February 8, 2014 || Mount Lemmon || Mount Lemmon Survey ||  || align=right | 2.9 km || 
|-id=387 bgcolor=#d6d6d6
| 543387 ||  || — || February 20, 2014 || Haleakala || Pan-STARRS ||  || align=right | 2.4 km || 
|-id=388 bgcolor=#d6d6d6
| 543388 ||  || — || October 6, 2005 || Mount Lemmon || Mount Lemmon Survey || 7:4 || align=right | 3.0 km || 
|-id=389 bgcolor=#d6d6d6
| 543389 ||  || — || February 20, 2014 || Kitt Peak || Spacewatch ||  || align=right | 3.2 km || 
|-id=390 bgcolor=#d6d6d6
| 543390 ||  || — || October 21, 2006 || Kitt Peak || Spacewatch || 7:4 || align=right | 2.3 km || 
|-id=391 bgcolor=#d6d6d6
| 543391 ||  || — || December 19, 2007 || Mount Lemmon || Mount Lemmon Survey ||  || align=right | 2.3 km || 
|-id=392 bgcolor=#fefefe
| 543392 ||  || — || February 21, 2014 || Kitt Peak || Spacewatch ||  || align=right data-sort-value="0.83" | 830 m || 
|-id=393 bgcolor=#fefefe
| 543393 ||  || — || November 17, 2009 || Kitt Peak || Spacewatch ||  || align=right data-sort-value="0.71" | 710 m || 
|-id=394 bgcolor=#fefefe
| 543394 ||  || — || February 14, 2010 || Kitt Peak || Spacewatch ||  || align=right | 1.1 km || 
|-id=395 bgcolor=#d6d6d6
| 543395 ||  || — || February 1, 2003 || Kitt Peak || Spacewatch || EOS || align=right | 2.4 km || 
|-id=396 bgcolor=#C2FFFF
| 543396 ||  || — || September 17, 2009 || Mount Lemmon || Mount Lemmon Survey || L4 || align=right | 7.9 km || 
|-id=397 bgcolor=#C2FFFF
| 543397 ||  || — || April 24, 2003 || Kitt Peak || Spacewatch || L4 || align=right | 8.1 km || 
|-id=398 bgcolor=#fefefe
| 543398 ||  || — || July 30, 2008 || Mount Lemmon || Mount Lemmon Survey ||  || align=right data-sort-value="0.73" | 730 m || 
|-id=399 bgcolor=#fefefe
| 543399 ||  || — || February 26, 2014 || Haleakala || Pan-STARRS ||  || align=right data-sort-value="0.61" | 610 m || 
|-id=400 bgcolor=#d6d6d6
| 543400 ||  || — || February 21, 2014 || Haleakala || Pan-STARRS ||  || align=right | 2.6 km || 
|}

543401–543500 

|-bgcolor=#fefefe
| 543401 ||  || — || October 18, 2009 || Mount Lemmon || Mount Lemmon Survey ||  || align=right data-sort-value="0.50" | 500 m || 
|-id=402 bgcolor=#fefefe
| 543402 ||  || — || June 17, 2005 || Mount Lemmon || Mount Lemmon Survey ||  || align=right data-sort-value="0.86" | 860 m || 
|-id=403 bgcolor=#d6d6d6
| 543403 ||  || — || February 27, 2014 || Mount Lemmon || Mount Lemmon Survey ||  || align=right | 2.6 km || 
|-id=404 bgcolor=#d6d6d6
| 543404 ||  || — || November 23, 2006 || Kitt Peak || Spacewatch ||  || align=right | 2.8 km || 
|-id=405 bgcolor=#E9E9E9
| 543405 ||  || — || February 28, 2014 || Haleakala || Pan-STARRS ||  || align=right | 1.3 km || 
|-id=406 bgcolor=#d6d6d6
| 543406 ||  || — || December 18, 2012 || Mount Lemmon SkyCe || Mount Lemmon Sky Center || EOS || align=right | 2.2 km || 
|-id=407 bgcolor=#d6d6d6
| 543407 ||  || — || April 11, 2002 || Palomar || NEAT || 7:4 || align=right | 4.7 km || 
|-id=408 bgcolor=#d6d6d6
| 543408 ||  || — || October 24, 2011 || Haleakala || Pan-STARRS || 7:4 || align=right | 2.9 km || 
|-id=409 bgcolor=#d6d6d6
| 543409 ||  || — || November 16, 2006 || Mount Lemmon || Mount Lemmon Survey ||  || align=right | 4.1 km || 
|-id=410 bgcolor=#fefefe
| 543410 ||  || — || February 11, 2014 || Mount Lemmon || Mount Lemmon Survey ||  || align=right data-sort-value="0.73" | 730 m || 
|-id=411 bgcolor=#fefefe
| 543411 ||  || — || September 23, 2009 || Mount Lemmon || Mount Lemmon Survey ||  || align=right data-sort-value="0.75" | 750 m || 
|-id=412 bgcolor=#fefefe
| 543412 ||  || — || October 15, 2001 || Palomar || NEAT ||  || align=right data-sort-value="0.89" | 890 m || 
|-id=413 bgcolor=#d6d6d6
| 543413 ||  || — || August 4, 2005 || Palomar || NEAT ||  || align=right | 3.6 km || 
|-id=414 bgcolor=#d6d6d6
| 543414 ||  || — || November 1, 2006 || Mount Lemmon || Mount Lemmon Survey || 7:4 || align=right | 5.1 km || 
|-id=415 bgcolor=#d6d6d6
| 543415 ||  || — || January 17, 2013 || Haleakala || Pan-STARRS || 3:2 || align=right | 3.9 km || 
|-id=416 bgcolor=#fefefe
| 543416 ||  || — || February 28, 2014 || Haleakala || Pan-STARRS ||  || align=right data-sort-value="0.70" | 700 m || 
|-id=417 bgcolor=#d6d6d6
| 543417 ||  || — || January 13, 2008 || Kitt Peak || Spacewatch ||  || align=right | 2.8 km || 
|-id=418 bgcolor=#fefefe
| 543418 ||  || — || January 2, 2000 || Kitt Peak || Spacewatch ||  || align=right data-sort-value="0.75" | 750 m || 
|-id=419 bgcolor=#d6d6d6
| 543419 ||  || — || February 28, 2014 || Haleakala || Pan-STARRS ||  || align=right | 2.5 km || 
|-id=420 bgcolor=#fefefe
| 543420 ||  || — || November 11, 2004 || Kitt Peak || Spacewatch ||  || align=right | 1.1 km || 
|-id=421 bgcolor=#d6d6d6
| 543421 ||  || — || October 29, 2005 || Mount Lemmon || Mount Lemmon Survey ||  || align=right | 3.1 km || 
|-id=422 bgcolor=#d6d6d6
| 543422 ||  || — || March 7, 2014 || Mount Lemmon || Mount Lemmon Survey || 7:4 || align=right | 2.5 km || 
|-id=423 bgcolor=#fefefe
| 543423 ||  || — || November 20, 2005 || Catalina || CSS ||  || align=right | 1.0 km || 
|-id=424 bgcolor=#d6d6d6
| 543424 ||  || — || March 28, 2014 || Mount Lemmon || Mount Lemmon Survey ||  || align=right | 2.7 km || 
|-id=425 bgcolor=#fefefe
| 543425 ||  || — || February 28, 2014 || Mount Lemmon || Mount Lemmon Survey ||  || align=right data-sort-value="0.73" | 730 m || 
|-id=426 bgcolor=#d6d6d6
| 543426 ||  || — || March 28, 2009 || Mount Lemmon || Mount Lemmon Survey ||  || align=right | 2.9 km || 
|-id=427 bgcolor=#fefefe
| 543427 ||  || — || February 26, 2014 || Haleakala || Pan-STARRS ||  || align=right data-sort-value="0.77" | 770 m || 
|-id=428 bgcolor=#fefefe
| 543428 ||  || — || April 4, 2014 || Mount Lemmon || Mount Lemmon Survey ||  || align=right data-sort-value="0.65" | 650 m || 
|-id=429 bgcolor=#fefefe
| 543429 ||  || — || July 29, 2008 || Kitt Peak || Spacewatch ||  || align=right data-sort-value="0.59" | 590 m || 
|-id=430 bgcolor=#E9E9E9
| 543430 ||  || — || June 14, 2006 || Siding Spring || SSS ||  || align=right | 1.4 km || 
|-id=431 bgcolor=#fefefe
| 543431 ||  || — || March 24, 2014 || Haleakala || Pan-STARRS ||  || align=right data-sort-value="0.91" | 910 m || 
|-id=432 bgcolor=#fefefe
| 543432 ||  || — || March 25, 2007 || Mount Lemmon || Mount Lemmon Survey ||  || align=right data-sort-value="0.67" | 670 m || 
|-id=433 bgcolor=#fefefe
| 543433 ||  || — || May 23, 2011 || Nogales || M. Schwartz, P. R. Holvorcem ||  || align=right data-sort-value="0.79" | 790 m || 
|-id=434 bgcolor=#E9E9E9
| 543434 ||  || — || April 9, 2014 || Haleakala || Pan-STARRS ||  || align=right | 1.8 km || 
|-id=435 bgcolor=#C2E0FF
| 543435 ||  || — || June 10, 2015 || Charleston || R. Holmes || plutinocritical || align=right | 171 km || 
|-id=436 bgcolor=#fefefe
| 543436 ||  || — || October 21, 2008 || Kitt Peak || Spacewatch ||  || align=right data-sort-value="0.78" | 780 m || 
|-id=437 bgcolor=#fefefe
| 543437 ||  || — || April 5, 2014 || Haleakala || Pan-STARRS ||  || align=right data-sort-value="0.56" | 560 m || 
|-id=438 bgcolor=#fefefe
| 543438 ||  || — || April 20, 2014 || Mount Lemmon || Mount Lemmon Survey ||  || align=right data-sort-value="0.83" | 830 m || 
|-id=439 bgcolor=#fefefe
| 543439 ||  || — || March 14, 2004 || Kitt Peak || Spacewatch ||  || align=right data-sort-value="0.93" | 930 m || 
|-id=440 bgcolor=#fefefe
| 543440 ||  || — || October 7, 2008 || Kitt Peak || Spacewatch ||  || align=right data-sort-value="0.61" | 610 m || 
|-id=441 bgcolor=#E9E9E9
| 543441 ||  || — || April 1, 2014 || Kitt Peak || Spacewatch ||  || align=right | 1.7 km || 
|-id=442 bgcolor=#fefefe
| 543442 ||  || — || April 25, 2007 || Kitt Peak || Spacewatch ||  || align=right | 1.1 km || 
|-id=443 bgcolor=#d6d6d6
| 543443 ||  || — || February 15, 2013 || Haleakala || Pan-STARRS || 3:2 || align=right | 3.7 km || 
|-id=444 bgcolor=#fefefe
| 543444 ||  || — || August 25, 2005 || Palomar || NEAT ||  || align=right | 1.0 km || 
|-id=445 bgcolor=#fefefe
| 543445 ||  || — || November 26, 2012 || Mount Lemmon || Mount Lemmon Survey ||  || align=right data-sort-value="0.63" | 630 m || 
|-id=446 bgcolor=#E9E9E9
| 543446 ||  || — || September 22, 2011 || Kitt Peak || Spacewatch ||  || align=right data-sort-value="0.76" | 760 m || 
|-id=447 bgcolor=#d6d6d6
| 543447 ||  || — || October 16, 2006 || Catalina || CSS ||  || align=right | 3.5 km || 
|-id=448 bgcolor=#fefefe
| 543448 ||  || — || August 21, 2008 || Kitt Peak || Spacewatch ||  || align=right data-sort-value="0.63" | 630 m || 
|-id=449 bgcolor=#fefefe
| 543449 ||  || — || April 29, 2014 || Haleakala || Pan-STARRS ||  || align=right data-sort-value="0.52" | 520 m || 
|-id=450 bgcolor=#E9E9E9
| 543450 ||  || — || April 29, 2014 || Haleakala || Pan-STARRS ||  || align=right | 1.3 km || 
|-id=451 bgcolor=#fefefe
| 543451 ||  || — || April 5, 2014 || Haleakala || Pan-STARRS ||  || align=right data-sort-value="0.71" | 710 m || 
|-id=452 bgcolor=#fefefe
| 543452 ||  || — || April 30, 2014 || Haleakala || Pan-STARRS ||  || align=right data-sort-value="0.75" | 750 m || 
|-id=453 bgcolor=#d6d6d6
| 543453 ||  || — || July 29, 2008 || Kitt Peak || Spacewatch || 3:2 || align=right | 4.2 km || 
|-id=454 bgcolor=#C2E0FF
| 543454 ||  || — || March 21, 2015 || Haleakala || Pan-STARRS || other TNO || align=right | 433 km || 
|-id=455 bgcolor=#fefefe
| 543455 ||  || — || April 30, 2014 || Haleakala || Pan-STARRS ||  || align=right data-sort-value="0.81" | 810 m || 
|-id=456 bgcolor=#fefefe
| 543456 ||  || — || October 9, 2008 || Catalina || CSS ||  || align=right | 1.1 km || 
|-id=457 bgcolor=#fefefe
| 543457 ||  || — || May 1, 2014 || ESA OGS || ESA OGS ||  || align=right data-sort-value="0.58" | 580 m || 
|-id=458 bgcolor=#fefefe
| 543458 ||  || — || April 24, 2014 || Haleakala || Pan-STARRS ||  || align=right data-sort-value="0.60" | 600 m || 
|-id=459 bgcolor=#fefefe
| 543459 ||  || — || May 1, 2014 || Mount Lemmon || Mount Lemmon Survey ||  || align=right data-sort-value="0.69" | 690 m || 
|-id=460 bgcolor=#d6d6d6
| 543460 ||  || — || June 2, 2003 || Kitt Peak || Spacewatch ||  || align=right | 2.6 km || 
|-id=461 bgcolor=#E9E9E9
| 543461 ||  || — || September 4, 2002 || Anderson Mesa || LONEOS ||  || align=right | 1.2 km || 
|-id=462 bgcolor=#fefefe
| 543462 ||  || — || September 23, 2011 || Haleakala || Pan-STARRS ||  || align=right data-sort-value="0.81" | 810 m || 
|-id=463 bgcolor=#E9E9E9
| 543463 ||  || — || May 20, 2006 || Siding Spring || SSS ||  || align=right | 1.3 km || 
|-id=464 bgcolor=#fefefe
| 543464 ||  || — || January 17, 2013 || Haleakala || Pan-STARRS ||  || align=right data-sort-value="0.82" | 820 m || 
|-id=465 bgcolor=#E9E9E9
| 543465 ||  || — || October 26, 2011 || Haleakala || Pan-STARRS ||  || align=right | 1.4 km || 
|-id=466 bgcolor=#fefefe
| 543466 ||  || — || May 8, 2014 || Haleakala || Pan-STARRS ||  || align=right data-sort-value="0.59" | 590 m || 
|-id=467 bgcolor=#fefefe
| 543467 ||  || — || December 4, 2012 || Mount Lemmon || Mount Lemmon Survey ||  || align=right data-sort-value="0.62" | 620 m || 
|-id=468 bgcolor=#fefefe
| 543468 ||  || — || March 26, 2007 || Kitt Peak || Spacewatch ||  || align=right data-sort-value="0.62" | 620 m || 
|-id=469 bgcolor=#E9E9E9
| 543469 ||  || — || May 9, 2014 || Haleakala || Pan-STARRS ||  || align=right | 1.2 km || 
|-id=470 bgcolor=#E9E9E9
| 543470 ||  || — || May 3, 2014 || Mount Lemmon || Mount Lemmon Survey ||  || align=right | 1.5 km || 
|-id=471 bgcolor=#fefefe
| 543471 ||  || — || May 8, 2014 || Haleakala || Pan-STARRS ||  || align=right data-sort-value="0.79" | 790 m || 
|-id=472 bgcolor=#fefefe
| 543472 ||  || — || October 15, 2001 || Kitt Peak || Spacewatch ||  || align=right data-sort-value="0.55" | 550 m || 
|-id=473 bgcolor=#fefefe
| 543473 ||  || — || May 4, 2014 || Haleakala || Pan-STARRS ||  || align=right data-sort-value="0.68" | 680 m || 
|-id=474 bgcolor=#E9E9E9
| 543474 ||  || — || April 5, 2014 || Haleakala || Pan-STARRS ||  || align=right | 1.7 km || 
|-id=475 bgcolor=#fefefe
| 543475 ||  || — || December 21, 2012 || Mount Lemmon || Mount Lemmon Survey ||  || align=right data-sort-value="0.57" | 570 m || 
|-id=476 bgcolor=#E9E9E9
| 543476 ||  || — || August 16, 2006 || Siding Spring || SSS ||  || align=right | 1.6 km || 
|-id=477 bgcolor=#fefefe
| 543477 ||  || — || October 10, 2004 || Palomar || NEAT ||  || align=right | 1.0 km || 
|-id=478 bgcolor=#E9E9E9
| 543478 ||  || — || June 20, 2002 || Palomar || NEAT ||  || align=right | 1.4 km || 
|-id=479 bgcolor=#d6d6d6
| 543479 ||  || — || May 6, 2014 || Mount Lemmon || Mount Lemmon Survey || 3:2 || align=right | 4.6 km || 
|-id=480 bgcolor=#fefefe
| 543480 ||  || — || October 16, 2002 || Palomar || NEAT ||  || align=right data-sort-value="0.67" | 670 m || 
|-id=481 bgcolor=#fefefe
| 543481 ||  || — || July 17, 2004 || Cerro Tololo || Cerro Tololo Obs. ||  || align=right data-sort-value="0.72" | 720 m || 
|-id=482 bgcolor=#fefefe
| 543482 ||  || — || May 25, 2003 || Kitt Peak || Spacewatch ||  || align=right data-sort-value="0.63" | 630 m || 
|-id=483 bgcolor=#E9E9E9
| 543483 ||  || — || January 30, 2009 || Mount Lemmon || Mount Lemmon Survey ||  || align=right | 1.3 km || 
|-id=484 bgcolor=#fefefe
| 543484 ||  || — || May 7, 2014 || Haleakala || Pan-STARRS ||  || align=right data-sort-value="0.60" | 600 m || 
|-id=485 bgcolor=#fefefe
| 543485 ||  || — || September 27, 2008 || Mount Lemmon || Mount Lemmon Survey ||  || align=right data-sort-value="0.71" | 710 m || 
|-id=486 bgcolor=#fefefe
| 543486 ||  || — || February 18, 2010 || Kitt Peak || Spacewatch ||  || align=right data-sort-value="0.73" | 730 m || 
|-id=487 bgcolor=#fefefe
| 543487 ||  || — || May 7, 2014 || Haleakala || Pan-STARRS ||  || align=right data-sort-value="0.61" | 610 m || 
|-id=488 bgcolor=#E9E9E9
| 543488 ||  || — || May 24, 2014 || Haleakala || Pan-STARRS ||  || align=right | 2.9 km || 
|-id=489 bgcolor=#fefefe
| 543489 ||  || — || May 28, 2014 || Mount Lemmon || Mount Lemmon Survey ||  || align=right data-sort-value="0.71" | 710 m || 
|-id=490 bgcolor=#fefefe
| 543490 ||  || — || November 1, 2005 || Mount Lemmon || Mount Lemmon Survey ||  || align=right data-sort-value="0.71" | 710 m || 
|-id=491 bgcolor=#E9E9E9
| 543491 ||  || — || September 26, 2006 || Catalina || CSS ||  || align=right | 1.6 km || 
|-id=492 bgcolor=#fefefe
| 543492 ||  || — || May 24, 2014 || Haleakala || Pan-STARRS ||  || align=right data-sort-value="0.47" | 470 m || 
|-id=493 bgcolor=#fefefe
| 543493 ||  || — || December 4, 2008 || Mount Lemmon || Mount Lemmon Survey ||  || align=right | 1.1 km || 
|-id=494 bgcolor=#fefefe
| 543494 ||  || — || November 21, 2008 || Kitt Peak || Spacewatch ||  || align=right data-sort-value="0.78" | 780 m || 
|-id=495 bgcolor=#fefefe
| 543495 ||  || — || July 25, 2003 || Palomar || NEAT || MAS || align=right data-sort-value="0.71" | 710 m || 
|-id=496 bgcolor=#fefefe
| 543496 ||  || — || November 20, 2003 || Kitt Peak || Kitt Peak Obs. ||  || align=right data-sort-value="0.93" | 930 m || 
|-id=497 bgcolor=#E9E9E9
| 543497 ||  || — || June 4, 2014 || Mount Lemmon || Mount Lemmon Survey ||  || align=right | 1.6 km || 
|-id=498 bgcolor=#fefefe
| 543498 ||  || — || May 7, 2014 || Haleakala || Pan-STARRS ||  || align=right data-sort-value="0.67" | 670 m || 
|-id=499 bgcolor=#fefefe
| 543499 ||  || — || November 22, 2012 || Kitt Peak || Spacewatch ||  || align=right data-sort-value="0.64" | 640 m || 
|-id=500 bgcolor=#E9E9E9
| 543500 ||  || — || June 5, 2014 || Haleakala || Pan-STARRS ||  || align=right | 1.1 km || 
|}

543501–543600 

|-bgcolor=#FA8072
| 543501 ||  || — || April 10, 2014 || Haleakala || Pan-STARRS || H || align=right data-sort-value="0.67" | 670 m || 
|-id=502 bgcolor=#fefefe
| 543502 ||  || — || July 7, 2007 || Lulin || LUSS ||  || align=right | 1.2 km || 
|-id=503 bgcolor=#E9E9E9
| 543503 ||  || — || November 1, 2006 || Mount Lemmon || Mount Lemmon Survey ||  || align=right | 1.9 km || 
|-id=504 bgcolor=#E9E9E9
| 543504 ||  || — || November 4, 2007 || Mount Lemmon || Mount Lemmon Survey ||  || align=right | 1.8 km || 
|-id=505 bgcolor=#E9E9E9
| 543505 ||  || — || October 16, 2006 || Catalina || CSS ||  || align=right | 1.5 km || 
|-id=506 bgcolor=#E9E9E9
| 543506 ||  || — || June 9, 2014 || Mount Lemmon || Mount Lemmon Survey ||  || align=right | 1.6 km || 
|-id=507 bgcolor=#E9E9E9
| 543507 ||  || — || June 3, 2014 || Haleakala || Pan-STARRS ||  || align=right | 1.5 km || 
|-id=508 bgcolor=#FA8072
| 543508 ||  || — || April 29, 2014 || Haleakala || Pan-STARRS ||  || align=right data-sort-value="0.63" | 630 m || 
|-id=509 bgcolor=#fefefe
| 543509 ||  || — || July 23, 2003 || Palomar || NEAT ||  || align=right | 1.3 km || 
|-id=510 bgcolor=#fefefe
| 543510 ||  || — || November 7, 2008 || Mount Lemmon || Mount Lemmon Survey ||  || align=right data-sort-value="0.92" | 920 m || 
|-id=511 bgcolor=#fefefe
| 543511 ||  || — || March 23, 2003 || Kitt Peak || Spacewatch ||  || align=right data-sort-value="0.73" | 730 m || 
|-id=512 bgcolor=#fefefe
| 543512 ||  || — || May 28, 2014 || Haleakala || Pan-STARRS ||  || align=right data-sort-value="0.78" | 780 m || 
|-id=513 bgcolor=#E9E9E9
| 543513 ||  || — || June 21, 2014 || Mount Lemmon || Mount Lemmon Survey ||  || align=right | 1.2 km || 
|-id=514 bgcolor=#E9E9E9
| 543514 ||  || — || September 22, 2006 || Anderson Mesa || LONEOS ||  || align=right | 1.3 km || 
|-id=515 bgcolor=#fefefe
| 543515 ||  || — || May 21, 2014 || Haleakala || Pan-STARRS ||  || align=right data-sort-value="0.68" | 680 m || 
|-id=516 bgcolor=#fefefe
| 543516 ||  || — || March 18, 2010 || Mount Lemmon || Mount Lemmon Survey ||  || align=right data-sort-value="0.77" | 770 m || 
|-id=517 bgcolor=#E9E9E9
| 543517 ||  || — || August 10, 2001 || Palomar || NEAT ||  || align=right | 1.6 km || 
|-id=518 bgcolor=#E9E9E9
| 543518 ||  || — || May 4, 2014 || Haleakala || Pan-STARRS ||  || align=right | 1.1 km || 
|-id=519 bgcolor=#fefefe
| 543519 ||  || — || June 21, 2014 || Haleakala || Pan-STARRS ||  || align=right data-sort-value="0.82" | 820 m || 
|-id=520 bgcolor=#fefefe
| 543520 ||  || — || May 17, 2007 || Kitt Peak || Spacewatch ||  || align=right data-sort-value="0.62" | 620 m || 
|-id=521 bgcolor=#E9E9E9
| 543521 ||  || — || January 30, 2004 || Kitt Peak || Spacewatch ||  || align=right | 1.5 km || 
|-id=522 bgcolor=#fefefe
| 543522 ||  || — || June 4, 2014 || Haleakala || Pan-STARRS ||  || align=right data-sort-value="0.80" | 800 m || 
|-id=523 bgcolor=#FA8072
| 543523 ||  || — || June 28, 2014 || Catalina || CSS ||  || align=right data-sort-value="0.47" | 470 m || 
|-id=524 bgcolor=#E9E9E9
| 543524 ||  || — || June 8, 2014 || Haleakala || Pan-STARRS ||  || align=right | 1.2 km || 
|-id=525 bgcolor=#fefefe
| 543525 ||  || — || January 31, 2006 || Kitt Peak || Spacewatch ||  || align=right data-sort-value="0.66" | 660 m || 
|-id=526 bgcolor=#fefefe
| 543526 ||  || — || March 14, 2010 || Mount Lemmon || Mount Lemmon Survey ||  || align=right data-sort-value="0.65" | 650 m || 
|-id=527 bgcolor=#fefefe
| 543527 ||  || — || September 13, 2007 || Kitt Peak || Spacewatch ||  || align=right data-sort-value="0.70" | 700 m || 
|-id=528 bgcolor=#E9E9E9
| 543528 ||  || — || May 26, 2001 || Kitt Peak || Spacewatch ||  || align=right | 1.8 km || 
|-id=529 bgcolor=#fefefe
| 543529 ||  || — || November 11, 2007 || Mount Lemmon || Mount Lemmon Survey ||  || align=right data-sort-value="0.82" | 820 m || 
|-id=530 bgcolor=#fefefe
| 543530 ||  || — || October 20, 2007 || Mount Lemmon || Mount Lemmon Survey ||  || align=right data-sort-value="0.86" | 860 m || 
|-id=531 bgcolor=#E9E9E9
| 543531 ||  || — || May 27, 2014 || Haleakala || Pan-STARRS ||  || align=right | 1.1 km || 
|-id=532 bgcolor=#fefefe
| 543532 ||  || — || November 6, 2012 || Kitt Peak || Spacewatch ||  || align=right data-sort-value="0.65" | 650 m || 
|-id=533 bgcolor=#fefefe
| 543533 ||  || — || October 10, 2007 || Kitt Peak || Spacewatch ||  || align=right data-sort-value="0.82" | 820 m || 
|-id=534 bgcolor=#fefefe
| 543534 ||  || — || June 29, 2014 || Mount Lemmon || Mount Lemmon Survey ||  || align=right data-sort-value="0.85" | 850 m || 
|-id=535 bgcolor=#fefefe
| 543535 ||  || — || April 7, 2013 || Mount Lemmon || Mount Lemmon Survey ||  || align=right data-sort-value="0.76" | 760 m || 
|-id=536 bgcolor=#fefefe
| 543536 ||  || — || August 30, 2011 || Haleakala || Pan-STARRS ||  || align=right data-sort-value="0.65" | 650 m || 
|-id=537 bgcolor=#fefefe
| 543537 ||  || — || May 6, 2014 || Haleakala || Pan-STARRS ||  || align=right data-sort-value="0.68" | 680 m || 
|-id=538 bgcolor=#E9E9E9
| 543538 ||  || — || October 11, 2010 || Mount Lemmon || Mount Lemmon Survey ||  || align=right | 1.9 km || 
|-id=539 bgcolor=#E9E9E9
| 543539 ||  || — || October 7, 2010 || Catalina || CSS ||  || align=right | 1.5 km || 
|-id=540 bgcolor=#E9E9E9
| 543540 ||  || — || May 7, 2014 || Haleakala || Pan-STARRS ||  || align=right | 1.6 km || 
|-id=541 bgcolor=#E9E9E9
| 543541 ||  || — || October 19, 2006 || Catalina || CSS ||  || align=right | 1.6 km || 
|-id=542 bgcolor=#d6d6d6
| 543542 ||  || — || November 12, 2010 || Mount Lemmon || Mount Lemmon Survey ||  || align=right | 2.2 km || 
|-id=543 bgcolor=#E9E9E9
| 543543 ||  || — || May 17, 2009 || Mount Lemmon || Mount Lemmon Survey ||  || align=right | 1.3 km || 
|-id=544 bgcolor=#fefefe
| 543544 ||  || — || February 9, 2013 || Haleakala || Pan-STARRS ||  || align=right data-sort-value="0.81" | 810 m || 
|-id=545 bgcolor=#fefefe
| 543545 ||  || — || December 31, 2008 || Kitt Peak || Spacewatch ||  || align=right data-sort-value="0.76" | 760 m || 
|-id=546 bgcolor=#E9E9E9
| 543546 ||  || — || January 1, 2012 || Mount Lemmon || Mount Lemmon Survey ||  || align=right | 1.7 km || 
|-id=547 bgcolor=#E9E9E9
| 543547 ||  || — || June 28, 2014 || Haleakala || Pan-STARRS ||  || align=right | 1.9 km || 
|-id=548 bgcolor=#E9E9E9
| 543548 ||  || — || November 15, 2010 || Mount Lemmon || Mount Lemmon Survey ||  || align=right | 1.6 km || 
|-id=549 bgcolor=#E9E9E9
| 543549 ||  || — || June 30, 2014 || Haleakala || Pan-STARRS ||  || align=right | 2.4 km || 
|-id=550 bgcolor=#E9E9E9
| 543550 ||  || — || August 21, 2001 || Palomar || NEAT ||  || align=right | 1.8 km || 
|-id=551 bgcolor=#E9E9E9
| 543551 ||  || — || September 9, 2015 || Haleakala || Pan-STARRS ||  || align=right data-sort-value="0.86" | 860 m || 
|-id=552 bgcolor=#E9E9E9
| 543552 ||  || — || September 28, 2006 || Mount Lemmon || Mount Lemmon Survey ||  || align=right | 1.5 km || 
|-id=553 bgcolor=#E9E9E9
| 543553 ||  || — || July 1, 2014 || Haleakala || Pan-STARRS ||  || align=right | 2.2 km || 
|-id=554 bgcolor=#FA8072
| 543554 ||  || — || May 5, 2014 || Mount Lemmon || Mount Lemmon Survey ||  || align=right | 1.4 km || 
|-id=555 bgcolor=#fefefe
| 543555 ||  || — || July 1, 2014 || Haleakala || Pan-STARRS ||  || align=right data-sort-value="0.57" | 570 m || 
|-id=556 bgcolor=#E9E9E9
| 543556 ||  || — || January 27, 2012 || Mount Lemmon || Mount Lemmon Survey ||  || align=right data-sort-value="0.75" | 750 m || 
|-id=557 bgcolor=#fefefe
| 543557 ||  || — || February 15, 2010 || Kitt Peak || Spacewatch ||  || align=right data-sort-value="0.77" | 770 m || 
|-id=558 bgcolor=#fefefe
| 543558 ||  || — || June 7, 2000 || Kitt Peak || Spacewatch ||  || align=right data-sort-value="0.55" | 550 m || 
|-id=559 bgcolor=#fefefe
| 543559 ||  || — || September 26, 2011 || Haleakala || Pan-STARRS ||  || align=right data-sort-value="0.56" | 560 m || 
|-id=560 bgcolor=#E9E9E9
| 543560 ||  || — || November 20, 2003 || Kitt Peak || Spacewatch ||  || align=right | 1.0 km || 
|-id=561 bgcolor=#E9E9E9
| 543561 ||  || — || November 18, 2006 || Kitt Peak || Spacewatch ||  || align=right | 1.5 km || 
|-id=562 bgcolor=#E9E9E9
| 543562 ||  || — || October 11, 2006 || Palomar || NEAT ||  || align=right | 1.7 km || 
|-id=563 bgcolor=#E9E9E9
| 543563 ||  || — || October 11, 2010 || Mount Lemmon || Mount Lemmon Survey ||  || align=right | 1.5 km || 
|-id=564 bgcolor=#E9E9E9
| 543564 ||  || — || December 3, 2002 || Palomar || NEAT ||  || align=right | 2.0 km || 
|-id=565 bgcolor=#E9E9E9
| 543565 ||  || — || March 29, 2009 || Mount Lemmon || Mount Lemmon Survey ||  || align=right data-sort-value="0.98" | 980 m || 
|-id=566 bgcolor=#fefefe
| 543566 ||  || — || July 2, 2014 || Haleakala || Pan-STARRS ||  || align=right data-sort-value="0.68" | 680 m || 
|-id=567 bgcolor=#E9E9E9
| 543567 ||  || — || June 3, 2014 || ESA OGS || ESA OGS ||  || align=right data-sort-value="0.83" | 830 m || 
|-id=568 bgcolor=#E9E9E9
| 543568 ||  || — || January 18, 2008 || Mount Lemmon || Mount Lemmon Survey ||  || align=right | 2.3 km || 
|-id=569 bgcolor=#fefefe
| 543569 ||  || — || July 24, 2003 || Palomar || NEAT ||  || align=right data-sort-value="0.67" | 670 m || 
|-id=570 bgcolor=#fefefe
| 543570 ||  || — || July 2, 2014 || Haleakala || Pan-STARRS ||  || align=right data-sort-value="0.77" | 770 m || 
|-id=571 bgcolor=#d6d6d6
| 543571 ||  || — || November 10, 2010 || Mount Lemmon || Mount Lemmon Survey ||  || align=right | 2.6 km || 
|-id=572 bgcolor=#E9E9E9
| 543572 ||  || — || October 22, 2006 || Palomar || NEAT ||  || align=right | 1.9 km || 
|-id=573 bgcolor=#fefefe
| 543573 ||  || — || July 3, 2014 || Haleakala || Pan-STARRS ||  || align=right data-sort-value="0.55" | 550 m || 
|-id=574 bgcolor=#E9E9E9
| 543574 ||  || — || May 7, 2014 || Haleakala || Pan-STARRS ||  || align=right | 1.7 km || 
|-id=575 bgcolor=#E9E9E9
| 543575 ||  || — || December 1, 2010 || Mount Lemmon || Mount Lemmon Survey ||  || align=right | 1.7 km || 
|-id=576 bgcolor=#fefefe
| 543576 ||  || — || July 6, 2014 || Haleakala || Pan-STARRS ||  || align=right data-sort-value="0.83" | 830 m || 
|-id=577 bgcolor=#E9E9E9
| 543577 ||  || — || July 10, 2005 || Siding Spring || SSS ||  || align=right | 2.4 km || 
|-id=578 bgcolor=#E9E9E9
| 543578 ||  || — || September 30, 2005 || Catalina || CSS ||  || align=right | 1.8 km || 
|-id=579 bgcolor=#E9E9E9
| 543579 ||  || — || June 3, 2014 || Haleakala || Pan-STARRS ||  || align=right | 1.9 km || 
|-id=580 bgcolor=#fefefe
| 543580 ||  || — || September 4, 2011 || Haleakala || Pan-STARRS ||  || align=right data-sort-value="0.78" | 780 m || 
|-id=581 bgcolor=#fefefe
| 543581 Laurenrubyjane ||  ||  || July 2, 2014 || iTelescope || N. Falla ||  || align=right data-sort-value="0.91" | 910 m || 
|-id=582 bgcolor=#fefefe
| 543582 ||  || — || May 7, 2006 || Mount Lemmon || Mount Lemmon Survey ||  || align=right data-sort-value="0.77" | 770 m || 
|-id=583 bgcolor=#E9E9E9
| 543583 ||  || — || July 1, 2014 || Haleakala || Pan-STARRS ||  || align=right | 1.3 km || 
|-id=584 bgcolor=#E9E9E9
| 543584 ||  || — || February 28, 2008 || Mount Lemmon || Mount Lemmon Survey ||  || align=right | 1.3 km || 
|-id=585 bgcolor=#E9E9E9
| 543585 ||  || — || July 7, 2014 || Haleakala || Pan-STARRS ||  || align=right | 2.2 km || 
|-id=586 bgcolor=#fefefe
| 543586 ||  || — || November 20, 2008 || Kitt Peak || Spacewatch ||  || align=right data-sort-value="0.81" | 810 m || 
|-id=587 bgcolor=#E9E9E9
| 543587 ||  || — || January 29, 2012 || Kitt Peak || Spacewatch ||  || align=right | 1.0 km || 
|-id=588 bgcolor=#E9E9E9
| 543588 ||  || — || November 13, 2006 || Catalina || CSS ||  || align=right | 1.9 km || 
|-id=589 bgcolor=#E9E9E9
| 543589 ||  || — || September 19, 2015 || Haleakala || Pan-STARRS ||  || align=right data-sort-value="0.91" | 910 m || 
|-id=590 bgcolor=#fefefe
| 543590 ||  || — || June 2, 2014 || Haleakala || Pan-STARRS ||  || align=right data-sort-value="0.69" | 690 m || 
|-id=591 bgcolor=#fefefe
| 543591 ||  || — || June 27, 2014 || Haleakala || Pan-STARRS ||  || align=right data-sort-value="0.63" | 630 m || 
|-id=592 bgcolor=#E9E9E9
| 543592 ||  || — || June 5, 2014 || Haleakala || Pan-STARRS ||  || align=right | 1.4 km || 
|-id=593 bgcolor=#E9E9E9
| 543593 ||  || — || February 9, 2008 || Mount Lemmon || Mount Lemmon Survey ||  || align=right | 2.0 km || 
|-id=594 bgcolor=#E9E9E9
| 543594 ||  || — || January 11, 2008 || Kitt Peak || Spacewatch ||  || align=right | 1.3 km || 
|-id=595 bgcolor=#fefefe
| 543595 ||  || — || October 24, 2011 || Haleakala || Pan-STARRS ||  || align=right data-sort-value="0.70" | 700 m || 
|-id=596 bgcolor=#E9E9E9
| 543596 ||  || — || September 17, 2010 || Catalina || CSS ||  || align=right | 1.3 km || 
|-id=597 bgcolor=#E9E9E9
| 543597 ||  || — || October 2, 2010 || Nogales || M. Schwartz, P. R. Holvorcem ||  || align=right | 1.4 km || 
|-id=598 bgcolor=#E9E9E9
| 543598 ||  || — || July 3, 2014 || Haleakala || Pan-STARRS ||  || align=right data-sort-value="0.93" | 930 m || 
|-id=599 bgcolor=#fefefe
| 543599 ||  || — || December 21, 2008 || Kitt Peak || Spacewatch ||  || align=right data-sort-value="0.60" | 600 m || 
|-id=600 bgcolor=#fefefe
| 543600 ||  || — || July 3, 2014 || Haleakala || Pan-STARRS ||  || align=right data-sort-value="0.79" | 790 m || 
|}

543601–543700 

|-bgcolor=#E9E9E9
| 543601 ||  || — || July 3, 2005 || Palomar || NEAT ||  || align=right | 2.9 km || 
|-id=602 bgcolor=#E9E9E9
| 543602 ||  || — || July 9, 2005 || Kitt Peak || Spacewatch ||  || align=right | 1.7 km || 
|-id=603 bgcolor=#fefefe
| 543603 ||  || — || December 4, 2008 || Mount Lemmon || Mount Lemmon Survey ||  || align=right data-sort-value="0.85" | 850 m || 
|-id=604 bgcolor=#E9E9E9
| 543604 ||  || — || July 3, 2014 || Haleakala || Pan-STARRS ||  || align=right data-sort-value="0.76" | 760 m || 
|-id=605 bgcolor=#fefefe
| 543605 ||  || — || July 25, 2014 || Haleakala || Pan-STARRS ||  || align=right data-sort-value="0.68" | 680 m || 
|-id=606 bgcolor=#fefefe
| 543606 ||  || — || February 14, 2013 || Haleakala || Pan-STARRS ||  || align=right data-sort-value="0.62" | 620 m || 
|-id=607 bgcolor=#fefefe
| 543607 ||  || — || July 25, 2014 || Haleakala || Pan-STARRS ||  || align=right data-sort-value="0.71" | 710 m || 
|-id=608 bgcolor=#fefefe
| 543608 ||  || — || October 9, 2007 || Kitt Peak || Spacewatch ||  || align=right data-sort-value="0.69" | 690 m || 
|-id=609 bgcolor=#fefefe
| 543609 ||  || — || November 24, 2008 || Mount Lemmon || Mount Lemmon Survey ||  || align=right data-sort-value="0.79" | 790 m || 
|-id=610 bgcolor=#fefefe
| 543610 ||  || — || September 4, 2011 || Haleakala || Pan-STARRS ||  || align=right data-sort-value="0.56" | 560 m || 
|-id=611 bgcolor=#E9E9E9
| 543611 ||  || — || September 17, 2006 || Catalina || CSS ||  || align=right data-sort-value="0.90" | 900 m || 
|-id=612 bgcolor=#fefefe
| 543612 ||  || — || July 25, 2014 || Haleakala || Pan-STARRS ||  || align=right data-sort-value="0.93" | 930 m || 
|-id=613 bgcolor=#E9E9E9
| 543613 ||  || — || January 18, 2012 || Kitt Peak || Spacewatch ||  || align=right data-sort-value="0.94" | 940 m || 
|-id=614 bgcolor=#E9E9E9
| 543614 ||  || — || December 18, 2007 || Mount Lemmon || Mount Lemmon Survey ||  || align=right data-sort-value="0.90" | 900 m || 
|-id=615 bgcolor=#fefefe
| 543615 ||  || — || April 11, 2003 || Kitt Peak || Spacewatch ||  || align=right data-sort-value="0.75" | 750 m || 
|-id=616 bgcolor=#fefefe
| 543616 ||  || — || June 11, 2010 || Mount Lemmon || Mount Lemmon Survey ||  || align=right data-sort-value="0.81" | 810 m || 
|-id=617 bgcolor=#E9E9E9
| 543617 ||  || — || October 4, 2006 || Mount Lemmon || Mount Lemmon Survey ||  || align=right | 1.2 km || 
|-id=618 bgcolor=#fefefe
| 543618 ||  || — || April 9, 2010 || Kitt Peak || Spacewatch ||  || align=right data-sort-value="0.59" | 590 m || 
|-id=619 bgcolor=#E9E9E9
| 543619 ||  || — || July 4, 2014 || Haleakala || Pan-STARRS ||  || align=right | 1.4 km || 
|-id=620 bgcolor=#E9E9E9
| 543620 ||  || — || July 30, 2005 || Palomar || NEAT ||  || align=right | 2.2 km || 
|-id=621 bgcolor=#fefefe
| 543621 ||  || — || August 22, 2007 || Charleston || R. Holmes ||  || align=right data-sort-value="0.75" | 750 m || 
|-id=622 bgcolor=#fefefe
| 543622 ||  || — || January 18, 2013 || Kitt Peak || Spacewatch ||  || align=right data-sort-value="0.62" | 620 m || 
|-id=623 bgcolor=#fefefe
| 543623 ||  || — || June 2, 2014 || Mount Lemmon || Mount Lemmon Survey ||  || align=right data-sort-value="0.82" | 820 m || 
|-id=624 bgcolor=#fefefe
| 543624 ||  || — || September 22, 2000 || Kitt Peak || Spacewatch ||  || align=right data-sort-value="0.68" | 680 m || 
|-id=625 bgcolor=#fefefe
| 543625 ||  || — || September 30, 2003 || Kitt Peak || Spacewatch ||  || align=right data-sort-value="0.77" | 770 m || 
|-id=626 bgcolor=#fefefe
| 543626 ||  || — || March 19, 2013 || Haleakala || Pan-STARRS ||  || align=right data-sort-value="0.62" | 620 m || 
|-id=627 bgcolor=#fefefe
| 543627 ||  || — || October 7, 2007 || Pla D'Arguines || R. Ferrando, M. Ferrando ||  || align=right data-sort-value="0.70" | 700 m || 
|-id=628 bgcolor=#fefefe
| 543628 ||  || — || June 27, 2014 || Haleakala || Pan-STARRS ||  || align=right data-sort-value="0.87" | 870 m || 
|-id=629 bgcolor=#E9E9E9
| 543629 ||  || — || May 23, 2001 || Cerro Tololo || J. L. Elliot, L. H. Wasserman ||  || align=right | 1.3 km || 
|-id=630 bgcolor=#E9E9E9
| 543630 ||  || — || June 20, 2014 || Haleakala || Pan-STARRS ||  || align=right data-sort-value="0.94" | 940 m || 
|-id=631 bgcolor=#fefefe
| 543631 ||  || — || April 26, 2006 || Cerro Tololo || Cerro Tololo Obs. ||  || align=right data-sort-value="0.65" | 650 m || 
|-id=632 bgcolor=#fefefe
| 543632 ||  || — || April 10, 2010 || Charleston || R. Holmes ||  || align=right data-sort-value="0.75" | 750 m || 
|-id=633 bgcolor=#E9E9E9
| 543633 ||  || — || January 2, 2012 || Kitt Peak || Spacewatch ||  || align=right | 1.2 km || 
|-id=634 bgcolor=#E9E9E9
| 543634 ||  || — || February 2, 2008 || Mount Lemmon || Mount Lemmon Survey ||  || align=right data-sort-value="0.86" | 860 m || 
|-id=635 bgcolor=#fefefe
| 543635 ||  || — || February 17, 2005 || La Silla || A. Boattini ||  || align=right data-sort-value="0.79" | 790 m || 
|-id=636 bgcolor=#fefefe
| 543636 ||  || — || September 24, 2011 || Bergisch Gladbach || W. Bickel ||  || align=right data-sort-value="0.80" | 800 m || 
|-id=637 bgcolor=#fefefe
| 543637 ||  || — || July 27, 2014 || Haleakala || Pan-STARRS ||  || align=right data-sort-value="0.64" | 640 m || 
|-id=638 bgcolor=#E9E9E9
| 543638 ||  || — || February 9, 2008 || Mount Lemmon || Mount Lemmon Survey ||  || align=right data-sort-value="0.90" | 900 m || 
|-id=639 bgcolor=#E9E9E9
| 543639 ||  || — || February 6, 2008 || Catalina || CSS ||  || align=right | 1.7 km || 
|-id=640 bgcolor=#E9E9E9
| 543640 ||  || — || July 27, 2014 || Haleakala || Pan-STARRS ||  || align=right data-sort-value="0.81" | 810 m || 
|-id=641 bgcolor=#E9E9E9
| 543641 ||  || — || December 29, 2011 || Mount Lemmon || Mount Lemmon Survey ||  || align=right data-sort-value="0.72" | 720 m || 
|-id=642 bgcolor=#E9E9E9
| 543642 ||  || — || July 27, 2014 || Haleakala || Pan-STARRS ||  || align=right | 1.3 km || 
|-id=643 bgcolor=#fefefe
| 543643 ||  || — || July 27, 2014 || Haleakala || Pan-STARRS ||  || align=right data-sort-value="0.69" | 690 m || 
|-id=644 bgcolor=#E9E9E9
| 543644 ||  || — || March 5, 2013 || Haleakala || Pan-STARRS ||  || align=right | 1.2 km || 
|-id=645 bgcolor=#E9E9E9
| 543645 ||  || — || July 27, 2014 || Haleakala || Pan-STARRS || EUN || align=right | 1.0 km || 
|-id=646 bgcolor=#E9E9E9
| 543646 ||  || — || July 27, 2014 || Haleakala || Pan-STARRS ||  || align=right | 1.1 km || 
|-id=647 bgcolor=#fefefe
| 543647 ||  || — || July 27, 2014 || Haleakala || Pan-STARRS ||  || align=right data-sort-value="0.65" | 650 m || 
|-id=648 bgcolor=#E9E9E9
| 543648 ||  || — || July 27, 2014 || Haleakala || Pan-STARRS ||  || align=right data-sort-value="0.75" | 750 m || 
|-id=649 bgcolor=#E9E9E9
| 543649 ||  || — || July 27, 2014 || Haleakala || Pan-STARRS ||  || align=right | 1.5 km || 
|-id=650 bgcolor=#E9E9E9
| 543650 ||  || — || July 27, 2014 || Haleakala || Pan-STARRS || MAR || align=right | 1.0 km || 
|-id=651 bgcolor=#fefefe
| 543651 ||  || — || April 10, 2010 || Mount Lemmon || Mount Lemmon Survey ||  || align=right data-sort-value="0.72" | 720 m || 
|-id=652 bgcolor=#E9E9E9
| 543652 ||  || — || July 27, 2014 || Haleakala || Pan-STARRS || (5) || align=right data-sort-value="0.63" | 630 m || 
|-id=653 bgcolor=#fefefe
| 543653 ||  || — || February 3, 2013 || Haleakala || Pan-STARRS ||  || align=right data-sort-value="0.84" | 840 m || 
|-id=654 bgcolor=#fefefe
| 543654 ||  || — || February 12, 2013 || ESA OGS || ESA OGS ||  || align=right data-sort-value="0.73" | 730 m || 
|-id=655 bgcolor=#E9E9E9
| 543655 ||  || — || February 25, 2007 || Kitt Peak || Spacewatch ||  || align=right | 2.4 km || 
|-id=656 bgcolor=#E9E9E9
| 543656 ||  || — || September 24, 2005 || Kitt Peak || Spacewatch ||  || align=right | 2.1 km || 
|-id=657 bgcolor=#fefefe
| 543657 ||  || — || August 10, 2007 || Kitt Peak || Spacewatch ||  || align=right data-sort-value="0.70" | 700 m || 
|-id=658 bgcolor=#fefefe
| 543658 ||  || — || June 27, 2014 || Haleakala || Pan-STARRS ||  || align=right data-sort-value="0.67" | 670 m || 
|-id=659 bgcolor=#E9E9E9
| 543659 ||  || — || July 27, 2014 || Haleakala || Pan-STARRS ||  || align=right | 1.2 km || 
|-id=660 bgcolor=#E9E9E9
| 543660 ||  || — || October 25, 2006 || Siding Spring || SSS ||  || align=right | 1.2 km || 
|-id=661 bgcolor=#fefefe
| 543661 ||  || — || February 4, 2009 || Mount Lemmon || Mount Lemmon Survey ||  || align=right data-sort-value="0.72" | 720 m || 
|-id=662 bgcolor=#E9E9E9
| 543662 ||  || — || July 27, 2014 || Haleakala || Pan-STARRS ||  || align=right data-sort-value="0.98" | 980 m || 
|-id=663 bgcolor=#E9E9E9
| 543663 ||  || — || February 2, 2008 || Kitt Peak || Spacewatch ||  || align=right | 1.3 km || 
|-id=664 bgcolor=#E9E9E9
| 543664 ||  || — || July 27, 2014 || Haleakala || Pan-STARRS ||  || align=right | 1.3 km || 
|-id=665 bgcolor=#E9E9E9
| 543665 ||  || — || February 16, 2012 || Haleakala || Pan-STARRS ||  || align=right data-sort-value="0.84" | 840 m || 
|-id=666 bgcolor=#E9E9E9
| 543666 ||  || — || January 22, 2012 || Haleakala || Pan-STARRS ||  || align=right | 1.7 km || 
|-id=667 bgcolor=#d6d6d6
| 543667 ||  || — || May 9, 2014 || Haleakala || Pan-STARRS ||  || align=right | 2.9 km || 
|-id=668 bgcolor=#fefefe
| 543668 ||  || — || June 2, 2014 || Mount Lemmon || Mount Lemmon Survey || MAS || align=right data-sort-value="0.68" | 680 m || 
|-id=669 bgcolor=#E9E9E9
| 543669 ||  || — || October 14, 2010 || Catalina || CSS ||  || align=right | 1.4 km || 
|-id=670 bgcolor=#E9E9E9
| 543670 ||  || — || November 27, 2011 || Mount Lemmon || Mount Lemmon Survey ||  || align=right | 1.4 km || 
|-id=671 bgcolor=#E9E9E9
| 543671 ||  || — || July 29, 2014 || Haleakala || Pan-STARRS ||  || align=right | 1.1 km || 
|-id=672 bgcolor=#fefefe
| 543672 ||  || — || April 24, 2006 || Kitt Peak || Spacewatch ||  || align=right data-sort-value="0.74" | 740 m || 
|-id=673 bgcolor=#fefefe
| 543673 ||  || — || July 29, 2014 || Haleakala || Pan-STARRS ||  || align=right data-sort-value="0.72" | 720 m || 
|-id=674 bgcolor=#E9E9E9
| 543674 ||  || — || September 27, 2006 || Mount Lemmon || Mount Lemmon Survey ||  || align=right | 1.3 km || 
|-id=675 bgcolor=#fefefe
| 543675 ||  || — || October 25, 2011 || Haleakala || Pan-STARRS ||  || align=right data-sort-value="0.68" | 680 m || 
|-id=676 bgcolor=#E9E9E9
| 543676 ||  || — || August 3, 2010 || Kitt Peak || Spacewatch ||  || align=right | 1.7 km || 
|-id=677 bgcolor=#E9E9E9
| 543677 ||  || — || June 29, 2014 || Haleakala || Pan-STARRS ||  || align=right data-sort-value="0.91" | 910 m || 
|-id=678 bgcolor=#E9E9E9
| 543678 ||  || — || June 27, 2014 || Haleakala || Pan-STARRS ||  || align=right | 1.5 km || 
|-id=679 bgcolor=#fefefe
| 543679 ||  || — || March 5, 2013 || Kitt Peak || Spacewatch ||  || align=right data-sort-value="0.70" | 700 m || 
|-id=680 bgcolor=#E9E9E9
| 543680 ||  || — || January 30, 2012 || Mount Lemmon || Mount Lemmon Survey ||  || align=right | 1.2 km || 
|-id=681 bgcolor=#E9E9E9
| 543681 ||  || — || October 13, 2010 || Mount Lemmon || Mount Lemmon Survey ||  || align=right | 1.5 km || 
|-id=682 bgcolor=#fefefe
| 543682 ||  || — || July 29, 2014 || Haleakala || Pan-STARRS ||  || align=right data-sort-value="0.75" | 750 m || 
|-id=683 bgcolor=#E9E9E9
| 543683 ||  || — || July 25, 2014 || Haleakala || Pan-STARRS ||  || align=right data-sort-value="0.73" | 730 m || 
|-id=684 bgcolor=#E9E9E9
| 543684 ||  || — || January 21, 2013 || Haleakala || Pan-STARRS ||  || align=right | 1.2 km || 
|-id=685 bgcolor=#E9E9E9
| 543685 ||  || — || February 16, 2012 || Haleakala || Pan-STARRS ||  || align=right | 1.9 km || 
|-id=686 bgcolor=#E9E9E9
| 543686 ||  || — || January 19, 2008 || Mount Lemmon || Mount Lemmon Survey ||  || align=right | 1.1 km || 
|-id=687 bgcolor=#fefefe
| 543687 ||  || — || March 3, 2006 || Catalina || CSS ||  || align=right data-sort-value="0.73" | 730 m || 
|-id=688 bgcolor=#d6d6d6
| 543688 ||  || — || January 16, 2007 || Mount Lemmon || Mount Lemmon Survey ||  || align=right | 2.9 km || 
|-id=689 bgcolor=#fefefe
| 543689 ||  || — || April 9, 2010 || Kitt Peak || Spacewatch ||  || align=right data-sort-value="0.74" | 740 m || 
|-id=690 bgcolor=#E9E9E9
| 543690 ||  || — || June 28, 2014 || Haleakala || Pan-STARRS ||  || align=right | 1.8 km || 
|-id=691 bgcolor=#E9E9E9
| 543691 ||  || — || November 8, 2010 || Mount Lemmon || Mount Lemmon Survey ||  || align=right | 1.8 km || 
|-id=692 bgcolor=#fefefe
| 543692 ||  || — || January 20, 2013 || Kitt Peak || Spacewatch ||  || align=right data-sort-value="0.59" | 590 m || 
|-id=693 bgcolor=#fefefe
| 543693 ||  || — || January 30, 2008 || Mount Lemmon || Mount Lemmon Survey ||  || align=right data-sort-value="0.73" | 730 m || 
|-id=694 bgcolor=#E9E9E9
| 543694 ||  || — || November 1, 2010 || Mount Lemmon || Mount Lemmon Survey ||  || align=right | 1.2 km || 
|-id=695 bgcolor=#E9E9E9
| 543695 ||  || — || July 22, 2001 || Palomar || NEAT ||  || align=right | 1.4 km || 
|-id=696 bgcolor=#E9E9E9
| 543696 ||  || — || April 10, 2013 || Mount Lemmon || Mount Lemmon Survey ||  || align=right | 1.1 km || 
|-id=697 bgcolor=#fefefe
| 543697 ||  || — || July 3, 2014 || Haleakala || Pan-STARRS ||  || align=right data-sort-value="0.62" | 620 m || 
|-id=698 bgcolor=#fefefe
| 543698 Miromesaroš ||  ||  || October 6, 2011 || Piszkesteto || S. Kürti, K. Sárneczky ||  || align=right data-sort-value="0.77" | 770 m || 
|-id=699 bgcolor=#fefefe
| 543699 ||  || — || January 20, 2009 || Mount Lemmon || Mount Lemmon Survey ||  || align=right data-sort-value="0.67" | 670 m || 
|-id=700 bgcolor=#E9E9E9
| 543700 ||  || — || June 27, 2014 || Haleakala || Pan-STARRS ||  || align=right | 1.3 km || 
|}

543701–543800 

|-bgcolor=#fefefe
| 543701 ||  || — || July 2, 2014 || Haleakala || Pan-STARRS ||  || align=right data-sort-value="0.55" | 550 m || 
|-id=702 bgcolor=#E9E9E9
| 543702 ||  || — || November 8, 2010 || Kitt Peak || Spacewatch ||  || align=right | 2.3 km || 
|-id=703 bgcolor=#fefefe
| 543703 ||  || — || October 22, 2011 || Kitt Peak || Spacewatch ||  || align=right data-sort-value="0.70" | 700 m || 
|-id=704 bgcolor=#E9E9E9
| 543704 ||  || — || December 31, 2007 || Kitt Peak || Spacewatch ||  || align=right data-sort-value="0.78" | 780 m || 
|-id=705 bgcolor=#E9E9E9
| 543705 ||  || — || May 15, 2009 || Kitt Peak || Spacewatch ||  || align=right | 1.6 km || 
|-id=706 bgcolor=#E9E9E9
| 543706 ||  || — || December 28, 1998 || Kitt Peak || Spacewatch ||  || align=right | 1.1 km || 
|-id=707 bgcolor=#E9E9E9
| 543707 ||  || — || July 30, 2014 || Haleakala || Pan-STARRS ||  || align=right | 1.5 km || 
|-id=708 bgcolor=#fefefe
| 543708 ||  || — || March 14, 1999 || Kitt Peak || Spacewatch ||  || align=right data-sort-value="0.64" | 640 m || 
|-id=709 bgcolor=#fefefe
| 543709 ||  || — || September 12, 2007 || Mount Lemmon || Mount Lemmon Survey ||  || align=right data-sort-value="0.76" | 760 m || 
|-id=710 bgcolor=#fefefe
| 543710 ||  || — || July 9, 2007 || Lulin || LUSS ||  || align=right data-sort-value="0.86" | 860 m || 
|-id=711 bgcolor=#fefefe
| 543711 ||  || — || November 16, 2011 || Mount Lemmon || Mount Lemmon Survey ||  || align=right data-sort-value="0.77" | 770 m || 
|-id=712 bgcolor=#fefefe
| 543712 ||  || — || September 27, 2011 || Kitt Peak || Spacewatch ||  || align=right data-sort-value="0.79" | 790 m || 
|-id=713 bgcolor=#E9E9E9
| 543713 ||  || — || August 29, 2006 || Kitt Peak || Spacewatch ||  || align=right | 1.00 km || 
|-id=714 bgcolor=#fefefe
| 543714 ||  || — || September 30, 2011 || Kitt Peak || Spacewatch ||  || align=right data-sort-value="0.75" | 750 m || 
|-id=715 bgcolor=#fefefe
| 543715 ||  || — || June 27, 2014 || Haleakala || Pan-STARRS ||  || align=right data-sort-value="0.71" | 710 m || 
|-id=716 bgcolor=#E9E9E9
| 543716 ||  || — || December 30, 2011 || Kitt Peak || Spacewatch ||  || align=right | 1.2 km || 
|-id=717 bgcolor=#fefefe
| 543717 ||  || — || November 13, 2007 || Mount Lemmon || Mount Lemmon Survey ||  || align=right data-sort-value="0.83" | 830 m || 
|-id=718 bgcolor=#fefefe
| 543718 ||  || — || January 1, 2012 || Mount Lemmon || Mount Lemmon Survey ||  || align=right data-sort-value="0.81" | 810 m || 
|-id=719 bgcolor=#d6d6d6
| 543719 ||  || — || August 15, 2009 || Kitt Peak || Spacewatch ||  || align=right | 2.8 km || 
|-id=720 bgcolor=#fefefe
| 543720 ||  || — || December 26, 2011 || Kitt Peak || Spacewatch ||  || align=right data-sort-value="0.90" | 900 m || 
|-id=721 bgcolor=#fefefe
| 543721 ||  || — || March 6, 2013 || Haleakala || Pan-STARRS ||  || align=right data-sort-value="0.69" | 690 m || 
|-id=722 bgcolor=#fefefe
| 543722 ||  || — || May 25, 2014 || Haleakala || Pan-STARRS ||  || align=right data-sort-value="0.68" | 680 m || 
|-id=723 bgcolor=#fefefe
| 543723 ||  || — || July 27, 2014 || Haleakala || Pan-STARRS ||  || align=right data-sort-value="0.67" | 670 m || 
|-id=724 bgcolor=#fefefe
| 543724 ||  || — || June 28, 2014 || Haleakala || Pan-STARRS ||  || align=right data-sort-value="0.99" | 990 m || 
|-id=725 bgcolor=#fefefe
| 543725 ||  || — || January 31, 2009 || Mount Lemmon || Mount Lemmon Survey ||  || align=right data-sort-value="0.96" | 960 m || 
|-id=726 bgcolor=#fefefe
| 543726 ||  || — || July 4, 2014 || Haleakala || Pan-STARRS || V || align=right data-sort-value="0.49" | 490 m || 
|-id=727 bgcolor=#E9E9E9
| 543727 ||  || — || September 17, 2010 || Catalina || CSS ||  || align=right | 1.4 km || 
|-id=728 bgcolor=#fefefe
| 543728 ||  || — || June 27, 2014 || Haleakala || Pan-STARRS ||  || align=right data-sort-value="0.83" | 830 m || 
|-id=729 bgcolor=#E9E9E9
| 543729 ||  || — || September 28, 2005 || Palomar || NEAT ||  || align=right | 2.5 km || 
|-id=730 bgcolor=#E9E9E9
| 543730 ||  || — || July 28, 2014 || Haleakala || Pan-STARRS || EUN || align=right | 1.1 km || 
|-id=731 bgcolor=#E9E9E9
| 543731 ||  || — || June 10, 2005 || Kitt Peak || Spacewatch ||  || align=right | 1.3 km || 
|-id=732 bgcolor=#E9E9E9
| 543732 ||  || — || September 3, 2014 || Catalina || CSS ||  || align=right | 2.4 km || 
|-id=733 bgcolor=#C2E0FF
| 543733 ||  || — || November 20, 2014 || Haleakala || Pan-STARRS || other TNO || align=right | 230 km || 
|-id=734 bgcolor=#C2E0FF
| 543734 ||  || — || November 12, 2014 || Haleakala || Pan-STARRS || res3:5 || align=right | 123 km || 
|-id=735 bgcolor=#C2E0FF
| 543735 ||  || — || January 22, 2015 || Haleakala || Pan-STARRS || SDO || align=right | 263 km || 
|-id=736 bgcolor=#fefefe
| 543736 ||  || — || January 30, 2006 || Flagstaff || L. H. Wasserman ||  || align=right data-sort-value="0.74" | 740 m || 
|-id=737 bgcolor=#E9E9E9
| 543737 ||  || — || July 10, 2010 || WISE || WISE ||  || align=right | 1.1 km || 
|-id=738 bgcolor=#E9E9E9
| 543738 ||  || — || October 22, 2006 || Goodricke-Pigott || R. A. Tucker ||  || align=right | 1.2 km || 
|-id=739 bgcolor=#fefefe
| 543739 ||  || — || December 31, 2008 || Kitt Peak || Spacewatch ||  || align=right data-sort-value="0.64" | 640 m || 
|-id=740 bgcolor=#fefefe
| 543740 ||  || — || October 12, 2007 || Mount Lemmon || Mount Lemmon Survey ||  || align=right data-sort-value="0.63" | 630 m || 
|-id=741 bgcolor=#E9E9E9
| 543741 ||  || — || January 26, 2012 || Mount Lemmon || Mount Lemmon Survey ||  || align=right | 1.3 km || 
|-id=742 bgcolor=#fefefe
| 543742 ||  || — || March 11, 2013 || Kitt Peak || Spacewatch ||  || align=right data-sort-value="0.82" | 820 m || 
|-id=743 bgcolor=#fefefe
| 543743 ||  || — || January 2, 2012 || Kitt Peak || Spacewatch ||  || align=right data-sort-value="0.58" | 580 m || 
|-id=744 bgcolor=#E9E9E9
| 543744 ||  || — || September 26, 2006 || Moletai || K. Černis, J. Zdanavičius ||  || align=right | 1.2 km || 
|-id=745 bgcolor=#fefefe
| 543745 ||  || — || October 9, 2007 || Mount Lemmon || Mount Lemmon Survey ||  || align=right data-sort-value="0.82" | 820 m || 
|-id=746 bgcolor=#E9E9E9
| 543746 ||  || — || September 30, 2006 || Kitt Peak || Spacewatch ||  || align=right | 1.1 km || 
|-id=747 bgcolor=#E9E9E9
| 543747 ||  || — || July 25, 2014 || Haleakala || Pan-STARRS ||  || align=right | 1.0 km || 
|-id=748 bgcolor=#E9E9E9
| 543748 ||  || — || July 25, 2014 || Haleakala || Pan-STARRS ||  || align=right data-sort-value="0.94" | 940 m || 
|-id=749 bgcolor=#fefefe
| 543749 ||  || — || February 14, 2009 || Kitt Peak || Spacewatch ||  || align=right data-sort-value="0.77" | 770 m || 
|-id=750 bgcolor=#E9E9E9
| 543750 ||  || — || October 22, 2006 || Kitt Peak || Spacewatch ||  || align=right data-sort-value="0.89" | 890 m || 
|-id=751 bgcolor=#d6d6d6
| 543751 ||  || — || July 27, 2014 || Haleakala || Pan-STARRS ||  || align=right | 2.7 km || 
|-id=752 bgcolor=#fefefe
| 543752 ||  || — || April 21, 2009 || Kitt Peak || Spacewatch ||  || align=right data-sort-value="0.98" | 980 m || 
|-id=753 bgcolor=#E9E9E9
| 543753 ||  || — || April 6, 2008 || Kitt Peak || Spacewatch ||  || align=right | 2.4 km || 
|-id=754 bgcolor=#d6d6d6
| 543754 ||  || — || July 30, 2014 || Haleakala || Pan-STARRS ||  || align=right | 2.4 km || 
|-id=755 bgcolor=#E9E9E9
| 543755 ||  || — || July 31, 2014 || Haleakala || Pan-STARRS ||  || align=right | 2.0 km || 
|-id=756 bgcolor=#E9E9E9
| 543756 ||  || — || July 31, 2014 || Haleakala || Pan-STARRS ||  || align=right | 1.5 km || 
|-id=757 bgcolor=#E9E9E9
| 543757 ||  || — || July 31, 2014 || Haleakala || Pan-STARRS ||  || align=right | 1.9 km || 
|-id=758 bgcolor=#E9E9E9
| 543758 ||  || — || July 27, 2014 || Haleakala || Pan-STARRS ||  || align=right | 1.2 km || 
|-id=759 bgcolor=#fefefe
| 543759 ||  || — || June 2, 2014 || Mount Lemmon || Mount Lemmon Survey ||  || align=right data-sort-value="0.79" | 790 m || 
|-id=760 bgcolor=#fefefe
| 543760 ||  || — || June 28, 2014 || Haleakala || Pan-STARRS ||  || align=right data-sort-value="0.61" | 610 m || 
|-id=761 bgcolor=#E9E9E9
| 543761 ||  || — || May 9, 2005 || Mount Lemmon || Mount Lemmon Survey ||  || align=right data-sort-value="0.97" | 970 m || 
|-id=762 bgcolor=#d6d6d6
| 543762 ||  || — || July 28, 2014 || ESA OGS || ESA OGS ||  || align=right | 2.1 km || 
|-id=763 bgcolor=#fefefe
| 543763 ||  || — || September 18, 2007 || Mount Lemmon || Mount Lemmon Survey ||  || align=right data-sort-value="0.73" | 730 m || 
|-id=764 bgcolor=#E9E9E9
| 543764 ||  || — || January 26, 2012 || Mount Lemmon || Mount Lemmon Survey ||  || align=right | 1.3 km || 
|-id=765 bgcolor=#fefefe
| 543765 ||  || — || October 20, 2003 || Kitt Peak || Spacewatch ||  || align=right data-sort-value="0.75" | 750 m || 
|-id=766 bgcolor=#E9E9E9
| 543766 ||  || — || December 31, 2007 || Mount Lemmon || Mount Lemmon Survey ||  || align=right data-sort-value="0.94" | 940 m || 
|-id=767 bgcolor=#fefefe
| 543767 ||  || — || December 2, 2005 || Mauna Kea || Mauna Kea Obs. ||  || align=right data-sort-value="0.69" | 690 m || 
|-id=768 bgcolor=#E9E9E9
| 543768 ||  || — || October 20, 2002 || Palomar || NEAT ||  || align=right | 1.1 km || 
|-id=769 bgcolor=#E9E9E9
| 543769 ||  || — || October 12, 2010 || Catalina || CSS ||  || align=right data-sort-value="0.86" | 860 m || 
|-id=770 bgcolor=#E9E9E9
| 543770 ||  || — || August 4, 2014 || Haleakala || Pan-STARRS ||  || align=right | 1.5 km || 
|-id=771 bgcolor=#E9E9E9
| 543771 ||  || — || February 14, 2008 || Mount Lemmon || Mount Lemmon Survey ||  || align=right | 1.8 km || 
|-id=772 bgcolor=#E9E9E9
| 543772 ||  || — || October 11, 2010 || Mount Lemmon || Mount Lemmon Survey ||  || align=right | 1.9 km || 
|-id=773 bgcolor=#E9E9E9
| 543773 ||  || — || February 7, 2004 || La Silla || Astrovirtel || NEM || align=right | 2.1 km || 
|-id=774 bgcolor=#E9E9E9
| 543774 ||  || — || January 19, 2012 || Mount Lemmon || Mount Lemmon Survey ||  || align=right | 1.5 km || 
|-id=775 bgcolor=#E9E9E9
| 543775 ||  || — || July 12, 2005 || Mount Lemmon || Mount Lemmon Survey ||  || align=right | 2.1 km || 
|-id=776 bgcolor=#E9E9E9
| 543776 ||  || — || April 14, 2013 || Mount Lemmon || Mount Lemmon Survey ||  || align=right | 1.1 km || 
|-id=777 bgcolor=#fefefe
| 543777 ||  || — || October 19, 1995 || Kitt Peak || Spacewatch ||  || align=right data-sort-value="0.71" | 710 m || 
|-id=778 bgcolor=#E9E9E9
| 543778 ||  || — || July 25, 2014 || Haleakala || Pan-STARRS ||  || align=right | 1.3 km || 
|-id=779 bgcolor=#E9E9E9
| 543779 ||  || — || January 19, 2012 || Haleakala || Pan-STARRS ||  || align=right | 2.1 km || 
|-id=780 bgcolor=#E9E9E9
| 543780 ||  || — || June 23, 2014 || Mount Lemmon || Mount Lemmon Survey ||  || align=right | 2.1 km || 
|-id=781 bgcolor=#fefefe
| 543781 ||  || — || July 29, 2014 || ESA OGS || ESA OGS ||  || align=right data-sort-value="0.65" | 650 m || 
|-id=782 bgcolor=#fefefe
| 543782 ||  || — || September 13, 2007 || Mount Lemmon || Mount Lemmon Survey ||  || align=right data-sort-value="0.71" | 710 m || 
|-id=783 bgcolor=#E9E9E9
| 543783 ||  || — || June 24, 2014 || Mount Lemmon || Mount Lemmon Survey ||  || align=right | 1.0 km || 
|-id=784 bgcolor=#E9E9E9
| 543784 ||  || — || April 15, 2013 || Haleakala || Pan-STARRS ||  || align=right | 1.6 km || 
|-id=785 bgcolor=#E9E9E9
| 543785 ||  || — || April 19, 2013 || Mount Lemmon || Mount Lemmon Survey ||  || align=right data-sort-value="0.94" | 940 m || 
|-id=786 bgcolor=#E9E9E9
| 543786 ||  || — || September 30, 2006 || Catalina || CSS ||  || align=right | 1.1 km || 
|-id=787 bgcolor=#E9E9E9
| 543787 ||  || — || September 30, 2006 || Mount Lemmon || Mount Lemmon Survey ||  || align=right | 1.1 km || 
|-id=788 bgcolor=#fefefe
| 543788 ||  || — || September 10, 2007 || Mount Lemmon || Mount Lemmon Survey ||  || align=right data-sort-value="0.76" | 760 m || 
|-id=789 bgcolor=#E9E9E9
| 543789 ||  || — || August 29, 2005 || Palomar || NEAT ||  || align=right | 2.0 km || 
|-id=790 bgcolor=#E9E9E9
| 543790 ||  || — || October 28, 2006 || Catalina || CSS ||  || align=right | 2.0 km || 
|-id=791 bgcolor=#fefefe
| 543791 ||  || — || June 2, 2014 || Mount Lemmon || Mount Lemmon Survey ||  || align=right data-sort-value="0.75" | 750 m || 
|-id=792 bgcolor=#E9E9E9
| 543792 ||  || — || September 25, 2006 || Catalina || CSS ||  || align=right | 1.3 km || 
|-id=793 bgcolor=#E9E9E9
| 543793 ||  || — || January 19, 2012 || Haleakala || Pan-STARRS ||  || align=right | 1.2 km || 
|-id=794 bgcolor=#E9E9E9
| 543794 ||  || — || December 2, 2010 || Catalina || CSS ||  || align=right | 1.4 km || 
|-id=795 bgcolor=#E9E9E9
| 543795 ||  || — || October 10, 2010 || Kitt Peak || Spacewatch ||  || align=right | 1.2 km || 
|-id=796 bgcolor=#E9E9E9
| 543796 ||  || — || June 29, 2014 || Haleakala || Pan-STARRS ||  || align=right | 1.4 km || 
|-id=797 bgcolor=#E9E9E9
| 543797 ||  || — || August 6, 2014 || Haleakala || Pan-STARRS ||  || align=right | 2.2 km || 
|-id=798 bgcolor=#E9E9E9
| 543798 ||  || — || December 20, 2006 || Palomar || NEAT ||  || align=right | 1.5 km || 
|-id=799 bgcolor=#E9E9E9
| 543799 ||  || — || November 20, 2003 || Kitt Peak || Spacewatch ||  || align=right | 1.4 km || 
|-id=800 bgcolor=#fefefe
| 543800 ||  || — || November 3, 2011 || Kitt Peak || Spacewatch ||  || align=right data-sort-value="0.79" | 790 m || 
|}

543801–543900 

|-bgcolor=#E9E9E9
| 543801 ||  || — || July 3, 2014 || Haleakala || Pan-STARRS ||  || align=right | 2.0 km || 
|-id=802 bgcolor=#E9E9E9
| 543802 ||  || — || August 18, 2014 || Haleakala || Pan-STARRS ||  || align=right | 1.1 km || 
|-id=803 bgcolor=#E9E9E9
| 543803 ||  || — || November 15, 2006 || Mount Lemmon || Mount Lemmon Survey ||  || align=right | 2.0 km || 
|-id=804 bgcolor=#fefefe
| 543804 ||  || — || March 6, 2013 || Haleakala || Pan-STARRS ||  || align=right data-sort-value="0.83" | 830 m || 
|-id=805 bgcolor=#E9E9E9
| 543805 ||  || — || January 19, 2012 || Haleakala || Pan-STARRS ||  || align=right data-sort-value="0.93" | 930 m || 
|-id=806 bgcolor=#E9E9E9
| 543806 ||  || — || November 26, 2011 || Mount Lemmon || Mount Lemmon Survey ||  || align=right | 1.7 km || 
|-id=807 bgcolor=#E9E9E9
| 543807 ||  || — || August 18, 2014 || Haleakala || Pan-STARRS ||  || align=right | 2.1 km || 
|-id=808 bgcolor=#E9E9E9
| 543808 ||  || — || June 17, 2005 || Mount Lemmon || Mount Lemmon Survey ||  || align=right | 1.5 km || 
|-id=809 bgcolor=#E9E9E9
| 543809 ||  || — || October 28, 2010 || Catalina || CSS ||  || align=right | 1.2 km || 
|-id=810 bgcolor=#E9E9E9
| 543810 ||  || — || September 13, 2005 || Kitt Peak || Spacewatch ||  || align=right | 1.5 km || 
|-id=811 bgcolor=#E9E9E9
| 543811 ||  || — || November 14, 2010 || Catalina || CSS ||  || align=right | 1.7 km || 
|-id=812 bgcolor=#E9E9E9
| 543812 ||  || — || January 24, 2012 || Haleakala || Pan-STARRS ||  || align=right | 1.3 km || 
|-id=813 bgcolor=#fefefe
| 543813 ||  || — || June 29, 2014 || Haleakala || Pan-STARRS ||  || align=right data-sort-value="0.72" | 720 m || 
|-id=814 bgcolor=#fefefe
| 543814 ||  || — || September 22, 2011 || Mount Lemmon || Mount Lemmon Survey ||  || align=right data-sort-value="0.67" | 670 m || 
|-id=815 bgcolor=#E9E9E9
| 543815 ||  || — || December 22, 2003 || Kitt Peak || Spacewatch ||  || align=right data-sort-value="0.90" | 900 m || 
|-id=816 bgcolor=#fefefe
| 543816 ||  || — || February 4, 2006 || Mount Lemmon || Mount Lemmon Survey ||  || align=right data-sort-value="0.57" | 570 m || 
|-id=817 bgcolor=#E9E9E9
| 543817 ||  || — || January 15, 2008 || Mount Lemmon || Mount Lemmon Survey ||  || align=right | 1.6 km || 
|-id=818 bgcolor=#fefefe
| 543818 ||  || — || July 1, 2014 || Haleakala || Pan-STARRS ||  || align=right data-sort-value="0.72" | 720 m || 
|-id=819 bgcolor=#fefefe
| 543819 ||  || — || July 1, 2014 || Haleakala || Pan-STARRS ||  || align=right data-sort-value="0.84" | 840 m || 
|-id=820 bgcolor=#fefefe
| 543820 ||  || — || March 12, 2013 || Kitt Peak || M. W. Buie ||  || align=right data-sort-value="0.67" | 670 m || 
|-id=821 bgcolor=#E9E9E9
| 543821 ||  || — || June 3, 2014 || Haleakala || Pan-STARRS ||  || align=right | 1.8 km || 
|-id=822 bgcolor=#fefefe
| 543822 ||  || — || August 20, 2014 || Haleakala || Pan-STARRS ||  || align=right data-sort-value="0.78" | 780 m || 
|-id=823 bgcolor=#fefefe
| 543823 ||  || — || November 2, 2011 || Kitt Peak || Spacewatch ||  || align=right data-sort-value="0.84" | 840 m || 
|-id=824 bgcolor=#d6d6d6
| 543824 ||  || — || September 26, 2005 || Kitt Peak || Spacewatch ||  || align=right | 2.1 km || 
|-id=825 bgcolor=#E9E9E9
| 543825 ||  || — || November 27, 2006 || Mount Lemmon || Mount Lemmon Survey ||  || align=right | 2.0 km || 
|-id=826 bgcolor=#fefefe
| 543826 ||  || — || January 1, 2009 || Kitt Peak || Spacewatch ||  || align=right data-sort-value="0.86" | 860 m || 
|-id=827 bgcolor=#E9E9E9
| 543827 ||  || — || June 30, 2014 || Mount Lemmon || Mount Lemmon Survey ||  || align=right | 1.3 km || 
|-id=828 bgcolor=#E9E9E9
| 543828 ||  || — || December 30, 2007 || Kitt Peak || Spacewatch ||  || align=right | 1.0 km || 
|-id=829 bgcolor=#E9E9E9
| 543829 ||  || — || October 10, 2010 || Mount Lemmon || Mount Lemmon Survey ||  || align=right | 1.9 km || 
|-id=830 bgcolor=#fefefe
| 543830 ||  || — || September 23, 2011 || Kitt Peak || Spacewatch ||  || align=right data-sort-value="0.71" | 710 m || 
|-id=831 bgcolor=#E9E9E9
| 543831 ||  || — || August 20, 2014 || Haleakala || Pan-STARRS ||  || align=right | 1.2 km || 
|-id=832 bgcolor=#E9E9E9
| 543832 ||  || — || January 26, 2012 || Mount Lemmon || Mount Lemmon Survey ||  || align=right | 1.2 km || 
|-id=833 bgcolor=#fefefe
| 543833 ||  || — || July 24, 2014 || Mayhill-ISON || L. Elenin ||  || align=right data-sort-value="0.82" | 820 m || 
|-id=834 bgcolor=#E9E9E9
| 543834 ||  || — || August 18, 2006 || Kitt Peak || Spacewatch ||  || align=right data-sort-value="0.75" | 750 m || 
|-id=835 bgcolor=#E9E9E9
| 543835 ||  || — || February 27, 2012 || Haleakala || Pan-STARRS ||  || align=right data-sort-value="0.73" | 730 m || 
|-id=836 bgcolor=#fefefe
| 543836 ||  || — || February 25, 2006 || Kitt Peak || Spacewatch || NYS || align=right data-sort-value="0.57" | 570 m || 
|-id=837 bgcolor=#E9E9E9
| 543837 ||  || — || April 20, 2009 || Kitt Peak || Spacewatch ||  || align=right | 1.0 km || 
|-id=838 bgcolor=#E9E9E9
| 543838 ||  || — || August 6, 2014 || Haleakala || Pan-STARRS ||  || align=right | 1.9 km || 
|-id=839 bgcolor=#fefefe
| 543839 ||  || — || November 9, 2007 || Mount Lemmon || Mount Lemmon Survey ||  || align=right data-sort-value="0.70" | 700 m || 
|-id=840 bgcolor=#fefefe
| 543840 ||  || — || September 5, 2010 || Mount Lemmon || Mount Lemmon Survey ||  || align=right data-sort-value="0.95" | 950 m || 
|-id=841 bgcolor=#E9E9E9
| 543841 ||  || — || November 3, 2010 || Catalina || CSS ||  || align=right | 1.2 km || 
|-id=842 bgcolor=#E9E9E9
| 543842 ||  || — || March 8, 2008 || Mount Lemmon || Mount Lemmon Survey ||  || align=right | 1.4 km || 
|-id=843 bgcolor=#E9E9E9
| 543843 ||  || — || February 26, 2004 || Kitt Peak || M. W. Buie, D. E. Trilling ||  || align=right | 1.3 km || 
|-id=844 bgcolor=#E9E9E9
| 543844 ||  || — || August 20, 2014 || Haleakala || Pan-STARRS ||  || align=right | 1.3 km || 
|-id=845 bgcolor=#E9E9E9
| 543845 ||  || — || August 6, 2014 || Haleakala || Pan-STARRS ||  || align=right | 1.8 km || 
|-id=846 bgcolor=#E9E9E9
| 543846 ||  || — || September 11, 2010 || Mount Lemmon || Mount Lemmon Survey ||  || align=right | 1.9 km || 
|-id=847 bgcolor=#fefefe
| 543847 ||  || — || October 24, 2011 || Haleakala || Pan-STARRS ||  || align=right data-sort-value="0.73" | 730 m || 
|-id=848 bgcolor=#fefefe
| 543848 ||  || — || December 16, 2007 || Mount Lemmon || Mount Lemmon Survey ||  || align=right data-sort-value="0.69" | 690 m || 
|-id=849 bgcolor=#fefefe
| 543849 ||  || — || November 11, 1999 || Kitt Peak || Spacewatch ||  || align=right data-sort-value="0.65" | 650 m || 
|-id=850 bgcolor=#E9E9E9
| 543850 ||  || — || December 3, 2010 || Mount Lemmon || Mount Lemmon Survey ||  || align=right | 2.5 km || 
|-id=851 bgcolor=#E9E9E9
| 543851 ||  || — || August 22, 2014 || Haleakala || Pan-STARRS || EUN || align=right | 1.2 km || 
|-id=852 bgcolor=#E9E9E9
| 543852 ||  || — || August 22, 2014 || Haleakala || Pan-STARRS ||  || align=right | 1.0 km || 
|-id=853 bgcolor=#fefefe
| 543853 ||  || — || February 1, 2006 || Kitt Peak || Spacewatch ||  || align=right data-sort-value="0.73" | 730 m || 
|-id=854 bgcolor=#fefefe
| 543854 ||  || — || November 16, 2011 || Kitt Peak || Spacewatch ||  || align=right data-sort-value="0.82" | 820 m || 
|-id=855 bgcolor=#E9E9E9
| 543855 ||  || — || November 7, 2010 || Mayhill-ISON || L. Elenin ||  || align=right | 1.3 km || 
|-id=856 bgcolor=#E9E9E9
| 543856 ||  || — || January 4, 2012 || Mount Lemmon || Mount Lemmon Survey ||  || align=right | 1.8 km || 
|-id=857 bgcolor=#E9E9E9
| 543857 ||  || — || November 19, 2007 || Mount Lemmon || Mount Lemmon Survey ||  || align=right data-sort-value="0.69" | 690 m || 
|-id=858 bgcolor=#fefefe
| 543858 ||  || — || October 25, 2011 || Haleakala || Pan-STARRS ||  || align=right data-sort-value="0.68" | 680 m || 
|-id=859 bgcolor=#fefefe
| 543859 ||  || — || March 6, 2013 || Haleakala || Pan-STARRS ||  || align=right data-sort-value="0.82" | 820 m || 
|-id=860 bgcolor=#fefefe
| 543860 ||  || — || October 10, 2007 || Kitt Peak || Spacewatch ||  || align=right data-sort-value="0.79" | 790 m || 
|-id=861 bgcolor=#E9E9E9
| 543861 ||  || — || August 22, 2014 || Haleakala || Pan-STARRS || JUN || align=right data-sort-value="0.74" | 740 m || 
|-id=862 bgcolor=#E9E9E9
| 543862 ||  || — || September 12, 2010 || Kitt Peak || Spacewatch ||  || align=right | 1.2 km || 
|-id=863 bgcolor=#E9E9E9
| 543863 ||  || — || February 22, 2004 || Kitt Peak || Spacewatch ||  || align=right | 1.1 km || 
|-id=864 bgcolor=#fefefe
| 543864 ||  || — || May 29, 2003 || Kitt Peak || Spacewatch ||  || align=right data-sort-value="0.60" | 600 m || 
|-id=865 bgcolor=#fefefe
| 543865 ||  || — || March 25, 2006 || Mount Lemmon || Mount Lemmon Survey ||  || align=right data-sort-value="0.53" | 530 m || 
|-id=866 bgcolor=#E9E9E9
| 543866 ||  || — || September 18, 2006 || Kitt Peak || Spacewatch ||  || align=right data-sort-value="0.62" | 620 m || 
|-id=867 bgcolor=#E9E9E9
| 543867 ||  || — || September 26, 2005 || Palomar || NEAT ||  || align=right | 2.7 km || 
|-id=868 bgcolor=#E9E9E9
| 543868 ||  || — || October 19, 2006 || Mount Lemmon || Mount Lemmon Survey ||  || align=right data-sort-value="0.72" | 720 m || 
|-id=869 bgcolor=#fefefe
| 543869 ||  || — || February 25, 2006 || Kitt Peak || Spacewatch ||  || align=right data-sort-value="0.75" | 750 m || 
|-id=870 bgcolor=#fefefe
| 543870 ||  || — || August 3, 2014 || Haleakala || Pan-STARRS ||  || align=right data-sort-value="0.99" | 990 m || 
|-id=871 bgcolor=#fefefe
| 543871 ||  || — || August 22, 2014 || Haleakala || Pan-STARRS ||  || align=right data-sort-value="0.72" | 720 m || 
|-id=872 bgcolor=#d6d6d6
| 543872 ||  || — || July 28, 2014 || Haleakala || Pan-STARRS ||  || align=right | 2.7 km || 
|-id=873 bgcolor=#E9E9E9
| 543873 ||  || — || October 1, 2005 || Kitt Peak || Spacewatch ||  || align=right | 1.4 km || 
|-id=874 bgcolor=#E9E9E9
| 543874 ||  || — || July 28, 2014 || Haleakala || Pan-STARRS ||  || align=right | 1.2 km || 
|-id=875 bgcolor=#E9E9E9
| 543875 ||  || — || February 28, 2012 || Haleakala || Pan-STARRS ||  || align=right | 1.5 km || 
|-id=876 bgcolor=#E9E9E9
| 543876 ||  || — || September 4, 2010 || Mount Lemmon || Mount Lemmon Survey ||  || align=right | 1.2 km || 
|-id=877 bgcolor=#E9E9E9
| 543877 ||  || — || November 1, 2005 || Catalina || CSS ||  || align=right | 1.7 km || 
|-id=878 bgcolor=#E9E9E9
| 543878 ||  || — || July 30, 2005 || Palomar || NEAT ||  || align=right | 2.1 km || 
|-id=879 bgcolor=#E9E9E9
| 543879 ||  || — || February 13, 2008 || Catalina || CSS ||  || align=right data-sort-value="0.88" | 880 m || 
|-id=880 bgcolor=#E9E9E9
| 543880 ||  || — || November 25, 2006 || Catalina || CSS ||  || align=right | 1.1 km || 
|-id=881 bgcolor=#E9E9E9
| 543881 ||  || — || August 22, 2014 || Haleakala || Pan-STARRS ||  || align=right | 1.5 km || 
|-id=882 bgcolor=#fefefe
| 543882 ||  || — || August 22, 2014 || Haleakala || Pan-STARRS ||  || align=right data-sort-value="0.67" | 670 m || 
|-id=883 bgcolor=#fefefe
| 543883 ||  || — || March 17, 2013 || Palomar || PTF ||  || align=right data-sort-value="0.77" | 770 m || 
|-id=884 bgcolor=#fefefe
| 543884 ||  || — || April 24, 2006 || Kitt Peak || Spacewatch ||  || align=right data-sort-value="0.67" | 670 m || 
|-id=885 bgcolor=#d6d6d6
| 543885 ||  || — || April 25, 2007 || Mount Lemmon || Mount Lemmon Survey ||  || align=right | 2.7 km || 
|-id=886 bgcolor=#E9E9E9
| 543886 ||  || — || October 17, 2010 || Mount Lemmon || Mount Lemmon Survey ||  || align=right | 2.0 km || 
|-id=887 bgcolor=#E9E9E9
| 543887 ||  || — || July 31, 2014 || Haleakala || Pan-STARRS ||  || align=right | 1.7 km || 
|-id=888 bgcolor=#fefefe
| 543888 ||  || — || December 22, 2008 || Kitt Peak || Spacewatch ||  || align=right data-sort-value="0.92" | 920 m || 
|-id=889 bgcolor=#E9E9E9
| 543889 ||  || — || August 22, 2014 || Haleakala || Pan-STARRS ||  || align=right | 1.8 km || 
|-id=890 bgcolor=#E9E9E9
| 543890 ||  || — || August 22, 2014 || Haleakala || Pan-STARRS ||  || align=right data-sort-value="0.82" | 820 m || 
|-id=891 bgcolor=#E9E9E9
| 543891 ||  || — || August 22, 2014 || Haleakala || Pan-STARRS ||  || align=right | 1.5 km || 
|-id=892 bgcolor=#fefefe
| 543892 ||  || — || July 31, 2014 || Haleakala || Pan-STARRS ||  || align=right data-sort-value="0.87" | 870 m || 
|-id=893 bgcolor=#E9E9E9
| 543893 ||  || — || January 8, 2002 || Palomar || NEAT ||  || align=right | 2.1 km || 
|-id=894 bgcolor=#E9E9E9
| 543894 ||  || — || August 22, 2014 || Haleakala || Pan-STARRS ||  || align=right data-sort-value="0.97" | 970 m || 
|-id=895 bgcolor=#fefefe
| 543895 ||  || — || January 9, 2006 || Kitt Peak || Spacewatch ||  || align=right data-sort-value="0.91" | 910 m || 
|-id=896 bgcolor=#E9E9E9
| 543896 ||  || — || February 1, 2003 || Palomar || NEAT ||  || align=right | 1.1 km || 
|-id=897 bgcolor=#E9E9E9
| 543897 ||  || — || July 27, 2001 || Haleakala || AMOS ||  || align=right | 2.6 km || 
|-id=898 bgcolor=#E9E9E9
| 543898 ||  || — || July 28, 2014 || Haleakala || Pan-STARRS ||  || align=right | 1.5 km || 
|-id=899 bgcolor=#E9E9E9
| 543899 ||  || — || August 16, 2006 || Palomar || NEAT ||  || align=right | 1.5 km || 
|-id=900 bgcolor=#E9E9E9
| 543900 ||  || — || December 28, 2011 || Mount Lemmon || Mount Lemmon Survey ||  || align=right | 1.0 km || 
|}

543901–544000 

|-bgcolor=#E9E9E9
| 543901 ||  || — || July 1, 2014 || Haleakala || Pan-STARRS ||  || align=right | 1.1 km || 
|-id=902 bgcolor=#d6d6d6
| 543902 ||  || — || July 31, 2008 || La Sagra || OAM Obs. ||  || align=right | 2.8 km || 
|-id=903 bgcolor=#E9E9E9
| 543903 ||  || — || August 23, 2014 || Haleakala || Pan-STARRS ||  || align=right | 1.1 km || 
|-id=904 bgcolor=#d6d6d6
| 543904 ||  || — || November 25, 2005 || Mount Lemmon || Mount Lemmon Survey ||  || align=right | 2.3 km || 
|-id=905 bgcolor=#fefefe
| 543905 ||  || — || September 22, 2003 || Kitt Peak || Spacewatch ||  || align=right data-sort-value="0.75" | 750 m || 
|-id=906 bgcolor=#E9E9E9
| 543906 ||  || — || July 7, 2014 || Haleakala || Pan-STARRS ||  || align=right | 1.3 km || 
|-id=907 bgcolor=#E9E9E9
| 543907 ||  || — || June 30, 2005 || Kitt Peak || Spacewatch ||  || align=right | 1.4 km || 
|-id=908 bgcolor=#fefefe
| 543908 ||  || — || September 12, 2007 || Kitt Peak || Spacewatch ||  || align=right data-sort-value="0.62" | 620 m || 
|-id=909 bgcolor=#fefefe
| 543909 ||  || — || June 29, 2014 || Haleakala || Pan-STARRS ||  || align=right data-sort-value="0.68" | 680 m || 
|-id=910 bgcolor=#E9E9E9
| 543910 ||  || — || April 19, 2013 || Haleakala || Pan-STARRS ||  || align=right | 1.8 km || 
|-id=911 bgcolor=#E9E9E9
| 543911 ||  || — || August 25, 2014 || Haleakala || Pan-STARRS ||  || align=right data-sort-value="0.82" | 820 m || 
|-id=912 bgcolor=#E9E9E9
| 543912 ||  || — || August 10, 2010 || Kitt Peak || Spacewatch ||  || align=right | 1.8 km || 
|-id=913 bgcolor=#E9E9E9
| 543913 ||  || — || December 29, 2011 || Mount Lemmon || Mount Lemmon Survey ||  || align=right | 1.6 km || 
|-id=914 bgcolor=#E9E9E9
| 543914 Tessedik ||  ||  || March 15, 2012 || Piszkesteto || S. Kürti, K. Sárneczky ||  || align=right data-sort-value="0.83" | 830 m || 
|-id=915 bgcolor=#E9E9E9
| 543915 ||  || — || August 25, 2014 || Haleakala || Pan-STARRS ||  || align=right | 1.4 km || 
|-id=916 bgcolor=#E9E9E9
| 543916 ||  || — || November 1, 2006 || Mount Lemmon || Mount Lemmon Survey ||  || align=right | 1.5 km || 
|-id=917 bgcolor=#E9E9E9
| 543917 ||  || — || August 3, 2014 || Haleakala || Pan-STARRS ||  || align=right | 2.0 km || 
|-id=918 bgcolor=#E9E9E9
| 543918 ||  || — || May 10, 2014 || Mount Lemmon || Mount Lemmon Survey ||  || align=right | 1.6 km || 
|-id=919 bgcolor=#E9E9E9
| 543919 ||  || — || July 31, 2014 || Haleakala || Pan-STARRS || EUN || align=right data-sort-value="0.82" | 820 m || 
|-id=920 bgcolor=#E9E9E9
| 543920 ||  || — || February 14, 2013 || Mount Lemmon || Mount Lemmon Survey ||  || align=right | 1.7 km || 
|-id=921 bgcolor=#fefefe
| 543921 ||  || — || August 3, 2014 || Haleakala || Pan-STARRS ||  || align=right data-sort-value="0.75" | 750 m || 
|-id=922 bgcolor=#E9E9E9
| 543922 ||  || — || January 27, 2012 || Mount Lemmon || Mount Lemmon Survey ||  || align=right | 1.3 km || 
|-id=923 bgcolor=#E9E9E9
| 543923 ||  || — || August 25, 2014 || Haleakala || Pan-STARRS ||  || align=right data-sort-value="0.89" | 890 m || 
|-id=924 bgcolor=#fefefe
| 543924 ||  || — || August 25, 2014 || Haleakala || Pan-STARRS ||  || align=right data-sort-value="0.71" | 710 m || 
|-id=925 bgcolor=#fefefe
| 543925 ||  || — || September 2, 2010 || Mount Lemmon || Mount Lemmon Survey ||  || align=right data-sort-value="0.77" | 770 m || 
|-id=926 bgcolor=#E9E9E9
| 543926 ||  || — || December 2, 2010 || Mount Lemmon || Mount Lemmon Survey ||  || align=right | 2.0 km || 
|-id=927 bgcolor=#E9E9E9
| 543927 ||  || — || March 30, 2008 || Kitt Peak || Spacewatch ||  || align=right | 2.0 km || 
|-id=928 bgcolor=#E9E9E9
| 543928 ||  || — || March 24, 2003 || Kitt Peak || Spacewatch ||  || align=right | 1.9 km || 
|-id=929 bgcolor=#E9E9E9
| 543929 ||  || — || April 7, 2003 || Kitt Peak || Spacewatch ||  || align=right | 2.6 km || 
|-id=930 bgcolor=#E9E9E9
| 543930 ||  || — || August 25, 2014 || Haleakala || Pan-STARRS ||  || align=right | 2.0 km || 
|-id=931 bgcolor=#fefefe
| 543931 ||  || — || February 16, 2005 || La Silla || A. Boattini ||  || align=right data-sort-value="0.91" | 910 m || 
|-id=932 bgcolor=#E9E9E9
| 543932 ||  || — || November 12, 2010 || Mount Lemmon || Mount Lemmon Survey ||  || align=right | 1.1 km || 
|-id=933 bgcolor=#E9E9E9
| 543933 ||  || — || August 25, 2014 || Haleakala || Pan-STARRS ||  || align=right | 1.2 km || 
|-id=934 bgcolor=#E9E9E9
| 543934 ||  || — || May 3, 2008 || Kitt Peak || Spacewatch ||  || align=right | 2.2 km || 
|-id=935 bgcolor=#d6d6d6
| 543935 ||  || — || January 28, 2011 || Mount Lemmon || Mount Lemmon Survey ||  || align=right | 2.3 km || 
|-id=936 bgcolor=#E9E9E9
| 543936 ||  || — || February 28, 2012 || Haleakala || Pan-STARRS ||  || align=right | 1.9 km || 
|-id=937 bgcolor=#E9E9E9
| 543937 ||  || — || August 25, 2014 || Haleakala || Pan-STARRS ||  || align=right | 2.2 km || 
|-id=938 bgcolor=#E9E9E9
| 543938 ||  || — || August 25, 2014 || Haleakala || Pan-STARRS ||  || align=right | 1.4 km || 
|-id=939 bgcolor=#E9E9E9
| 543939 ||  || — || March 24, 2012 || Mount Lemmon || Mount Lemmon Survey ||  || align=right | 2.2 km || 
|-id=940 bgcolor=#E9E9E9
| 543940 ||  || — || November 8, 2010 || Mount Lemmon || Mount Lemmon Survey ||  || align=right | 1.1 km || 
|-id=941 bgcolor=#E9E9E9
| 543941 ||  || — || January 19, 2012 || Haleakala || Pan-STARRS ||  || align=right | 1.4 km || 
|-id=942 bgcolor=#fefefe
| 543942 ||  || — || October 20, 2011 || Mount Lemmon || Mount Lemmon Survey ||  || align=right data-sort-value="0.80" | 800 m || 
|-id=943 bgcolor=#E9E9E9
| 543943 ||  || — || June 3, 2014 || Haleakala || Pan-STARRS ||  || align=right | 1.5 km || 
|-id=944 bgcolor=#fefefe
| 543944 ||  || — || March 3, 2013 || Mount Lemmon || Mount Lemmon Survey ||  || align=right data-sort-value="0.71" | 710 m || 
|-id=945 bgcolor=#fefefe
| 543945 ||  || — || July 5, 2010 || Kitt Peak || Spacewatch ||  || align=right data-sort-value="0.66" | 660 m || 
|-id=946 bgcolor=#d6d6d6
| 543946 ||  || — || February 23, 2012 || Kitt Peak || Spacewatch ||  || align=right | 2.7 km || 
|-id=947 bgcolor=#E9E9E9
| 543947 ||  || — || October 23, 2006 || Mount Lemmon || Mount Lemmon Survey ||  || align=right data-sort-value="0.68" | 680 m || 
|-id=948 bgcolor=#E9E9E9
| 543948 ||  || — || February 25, 2012 || Kitt Peak || Spacewatch ||  || align=right | 2.4 km || 
|-id=949 bgcolor=#E9E9E9
| 543949 ||  || — || November 6, 2010 || Mount Lemmon || Mount Lemmon Survey ||  || align=right | 1.4 km || 
|-id=950 bgcolor=#E9E9E9
| 543950 ||  || — || February 21, 2012 || Mount Lemmon || Mount Lemmon Survey ||  || align=right | 1.5 km || 
|-id=951 bgcolor=#E9E9E9
| 543951 ||  || — || August 27, 2014 || Haleakala || Pan-STARRS ||  || align=right data-sort-value="0.72" | 720 m || 
|-id=952 bgcolor=#d6d6d6
| 543952 ||  || — || January 14, 2011 || Kitt Peak || Spacewatch ||  || align=right | 2.8 km || 
|-id=953 bgcolor=#E9E9E9
| 543953 ||  || — || January 1, 2012 || Mount Lemmon || Mount Lemmon Survey ||  || align=right | 1.7 km || 
|-id=954 bgcolor=#d6d6d6
| 543954 ||  || — || September 20, 2008 || Mount Lemmon || Mount Lemmon Survey ||  || align=right | 2.9 km || 
|-id=955 bgcolor=#E9E9E9
| 543955 ||  || — || January 19, 2012 || Haleakala || Pan-STARRS ||  || align=right | 3.1 km || 
|-id=956 bgcolor=#fefefe
| 543956 ||  || — || April 1, 2003 || Kitt Peak || M. W. Buie, A. B. Jordan ||  || align=right data-sort-value="0.72" | 720 m || 
|-id=957 bgcolor=#E9E9E9
| 543957 ||  || — || July 23, 2001 || Palomar || NEAT ||  || align=right | 1.8 km || 
|-id=958 bgcolor=#E9E9E9
| 543958 ||  || — || August 21, 2006 || Kitt Peak || Spacewatch ||  || align=right data-sort-value="0.71" | 710 m || 
|-id=959 bgcolor=#E9E9E9
| 543959 ||  || — || October 23, 2006 || Mount Lemmon || Mount Lemmon Survey ||  || align=right | 1.3 km || 
|-id=960 bgcolor=#fefefe
| 543960 ||  || — || June 14, 2010 || Mount Lemmon || Mount Lemmon Survey ||  || align=right data-sort-value="0.85" | 850 m || 
|-id=961 bgcolor=#E9E9E9
| 543961 ||  || — || September 16, 2006 || Catalina || CSS ||  || align=right | 1.7 km || 
|-id=962 bgcolor=#fefefe
| 543962 ||  || — || February 25, 2006 || Mount Lemmon || Mount Lemmon Survey ||  || align=right data-sort-value="0.63" | 630 m || 
|-id=963 bgcolor=#fefefe
| 543963 ||  || — || August 10, 2007 || Kitt Peak || Spacewatch ||  || align=right data-sort-value="0.54" | 540 m || 
|-id=964 bgcolor=#E9E9E9
| 543964 ||  || — || January 17, 2007 || Kitt Peak || Spacewatch ||  || align=right | 2.5 km || 
|-id=965 bgcolor=#E9E9E9
| 543965 ||  || — || August 21, 2006 || Kitt Peak || Spacewatch ||  || align=right data-sort-value="0.78" | 780 m || 
|-id=966 bgcolor=#fefefe
| 543966 ||  || — || November 19, 2007 || Mount Lemmon || Mount Lemmon Survey ||  || align=right | 1.2 km || 
|-id=967 bgcolor=#E9E9E9
| 543967 ||  || — || August 30, 2005 || Kitt Peak || Spacewatch ||  || align=right | 1.3 km || 
|-id=968 bgcolor=#E9E9E9
| 543968 ||  || — || August 30, 2014 || Catalina || CSS ||  || align=right | 2.0 km || 
|-id=969 bgcolor=#E9E9E9
| 543969 ||  || — || January 28, 2007 || Mount Lemmon || Mount Lemmon Survey ||  || align=right | 1.4 km || 
|-id=970 bgcolor=#fefefe
| 543970 ||  || — || September 17, 2003 || Kitt Peak || Spacewatch ||  || align=right data-sort-value="0.91" | 910 m || 
|-id=971 bgcolor=#E9E9E9
| 543971 ||  || — || April 11, 2013 || Siding Spring || SSS ||  || align=right | 1.6 km || 
|-id=972 bgcolor=#d6d6d6
| 543972 ||  || — || April 20, 2013 || Mount Lemmon || Mount Lemmon Survey ||  || align=right | 3.1 km || 
|-id=973 bgcolor=#fefefe
| 543973 ||  || — || July 7, 2014 || Haleakala || Pan-STARRS ||  || align=right data-sort-value="0.78" | 780 m || 
|-id=974 bgcolor=#d6d6d6
| 543974 ||  || — || February 24, 2012 || Haleakala || Pan-STARRS ||  || align=right | 3.0 km || 
|-id=975 bgcolor=#E9E9E9
| 543975 ||  || — || October 27, 2006 || Catalina || CSS ||  || align=right | 1.2 km || 
|-id=976 bgcolor=#E9E9E9
| 543976 ||  || — || October 27, 2005 || Catalina || CSS ||  || align=right | 2.1 km || 
|-id=977 bgcolor=#d6d6d6
| 543977 ||  || — || January 31, 2006 || Mount Lemmon || Mount Lemmon Survey ||  || align=right | 2.6 km || 
|-id=978 bgcolor=#d6d6d6
| 543978 ||  || — || February 2, 2006 || Mount Lemmon || Mount Lemmon Survey ||  || align=right | 2.9 km || 
|-id=979 bgcolor=#E9E9E9
| 543979 ||  || — || August 20, 2014 || Haleakala || Pan-STARRS ||  || align=right | 1.6 km || 
|-id=980 bgcolor=#E9E9E9
| 543980 ||  || — || December 13, 2006 || Mount Lemmon || Mount Lemmon Survey ||  || align=right | 1.5 km || 
|-id=981 bgcolor=#E9E9E9
| 543981 ||  || — || August 23, 2014 || Haleakala || Pan-STARRS ||  || align=right | 1.7 km || 
|-id=982 bgcolor=#E9E9E9
| 543982 ||  || — || April 27, 2012 || Haleakala || Pan-STARRS ||  || align=right | 2.1 km || 
|-id=983 bgcolor=#E9E9E9
| 543983 ||  || — || October 22, 2006 || Catalina || CSS ||  || align=right data-sort-value="0.87" | 870 m || 
|-id=984 bgcolor=#E9E9E9
| 543984 ||  || — || July 27, 2009 || Kitt Peak || Spacewatch ||  || align=right | 2.1 km || 
|-id=985 bgcolor=#E9E9E9
| 543985 ||  || — || August 25, 2014 || Haleakala || Pan-STARRS ||  || align=right data-sort-value="0.98" | 980 m || 
|-id=986 bgcolor=#E9E9E9
| 543986 ||  || — || November 13, 2006 || Catalina || CSS ||  || align=right | 1.1 km || 
|-id=987 bgcolor=#E9E9E9
| 543987 ||  || — || March 12, 2007 || Mount Lemmon || Mount Lemmon Survey ||  || align=right | 2.4 km || 
|-id=988 bgcolor=#E9E9E9
| 543988 ||  || — || September 18, 2006 || Kitt Peak || Spacewatch ||  || align=right data-sort-value="0.87" | 870 m || 
|-id=989 bgcolor=#E9E9E9
| 543989 ||  || — || March 31, 2008 || Mount Lemmon || Mount Lemmon Survey ||  || align=right | 2.1 km || 
|-id=990 bgcolor=#E9E9E9
| 543990 ||  || — || April 12, 2012 || Haleakala || Pan-STARRS ||  || align=right | 2.1 km || 
|-id=991 bgcolor=#E9E9E9
| 543991 ||  || — || November 8, 2010 || Kitt Peak || Spacewatch ||  || align=right | 1.4 km || 
|-id=992 bgcolor=#E9E9E9
| 543992 ||  || — || October 12, 2006 || Palomar || NEAT ||  || align=right data-sort-value="0.94" | 940 m || 
|-id=993 bgcolor=#E9E9E9
| 543993 ||  || — || October 13, 2010 || Mount Lemmon || Mount Lemmon Survey ||  || align=right | 1.8 km || 
|-id=994 bgcolor=#E9E9E9
| 543994 ||  || — || August 18, 2014 || Haleakala || Pan-STARRS ||  || align=right | 1.8 km || 
|-id=995 bgcolor=#E9E9E9
| 543995 ||  || — || August 20, 2014 || Haleakala || Pan-STARRS ||  || align=right data-sort-value="0.87" | 870 m || 
|-id=996 bgcolor=#E9E9E9
| 543996 ||  || — || August 20, 2014 || Haleakala || Pan-STARRS ||  || align=right | 1.9 km || 
|-id=997 bgcolor=#E9E9E9
| 543997 ||  || — || April 13, 2013 || Haleakala || Pan-STARRS ||  || align=right | 2.0 km || 
|-id=998 bgcolor=#E9E9E9
| 543998 ||  || — || August 23, 2014 || Haleakala || Pan-STARRS ||  || align=right | 1.9 km || 
|-id=999 bgcolor=#E9E9E9
| 543999 ||  || — || December 3, 2010 || Mount Lemmon || Mount Lemmon Survey ||  || align=right | 1.9 km || 
|-id=000 bgcolor=#E9E9E9
| 544000 ||  || — || August 30, 2014 || Haleakala || Pan-STARRS ||  || align=right | 1.2 km || 
|}

References

External links 
 Discovery Circumstances: Numbered Minor Planets (540001)–(545000) (IAU Minor Planet Center)

0543